= Hilda, Texas =

- unincorporated community
- Location within the state of Texas Hilda, Texas (the United States)
- Coordinates: 30°35′13″N 99°06′52″W
- Country: United States
- State: Texas
- County: Mason
- Elevation: 1,480 ft (451 m)
- Time zone: UTC-6 (Central (CST))
  - Summer (DST): UTC-5 (CDT)
- Area code: 319
- FIPS code: 48-33932
- GNIS feature ID: 1379932

Hilda is an unincorporated farming and ranching community established c. 1852 in Mason County, in the U.S. state of Texas. It is located on RM 783, halfway between Mason and Doss. Hilda was founded by German immigrants settling in the Fisher–Miller Land Grant territory. Area residents were farmers and ranchers who traveled to Fredericksburg for their basic supplies, prior to the 1858 establishment of Fort Mason. Today, Hilda is sparsely populated, but still has an active church. 35 families still lived there as of 1939.

The Hilda Community United Methodist Church was begun as the Beaver Creek United Methodist Church by Reverend Charles Grote c.1851. He initially was called to minister in the communities begun along the Llano River by the Darmstadt Society of Forty: Bettina, Castell and Leiningen. The original services were held outdoors along Beaver Creek. A year earlier, Rev. Conrad Pluenneke had also come to the area to minister to local settlers. In absence of a structure, these ministers were circuit rider pastors. In 1859, August Engel became an additional circuit rider for the congregations. The area Methodists gradually began forming an area organization and drew up a charter. The first parsonage was built in 1861. Erection of a church building that also served as a school took place in 1880. The current existing church was constructed as a replacement in 1902.

Hilda had a post office from 1901 until 1919, at which time the mail services were redirected to nearby Loyal Valley.

== See also ==
- Texas Hill Country
