= Ferdinand Lindheimer =

German-American botanist

Ferdinand Jacob Lindheimer
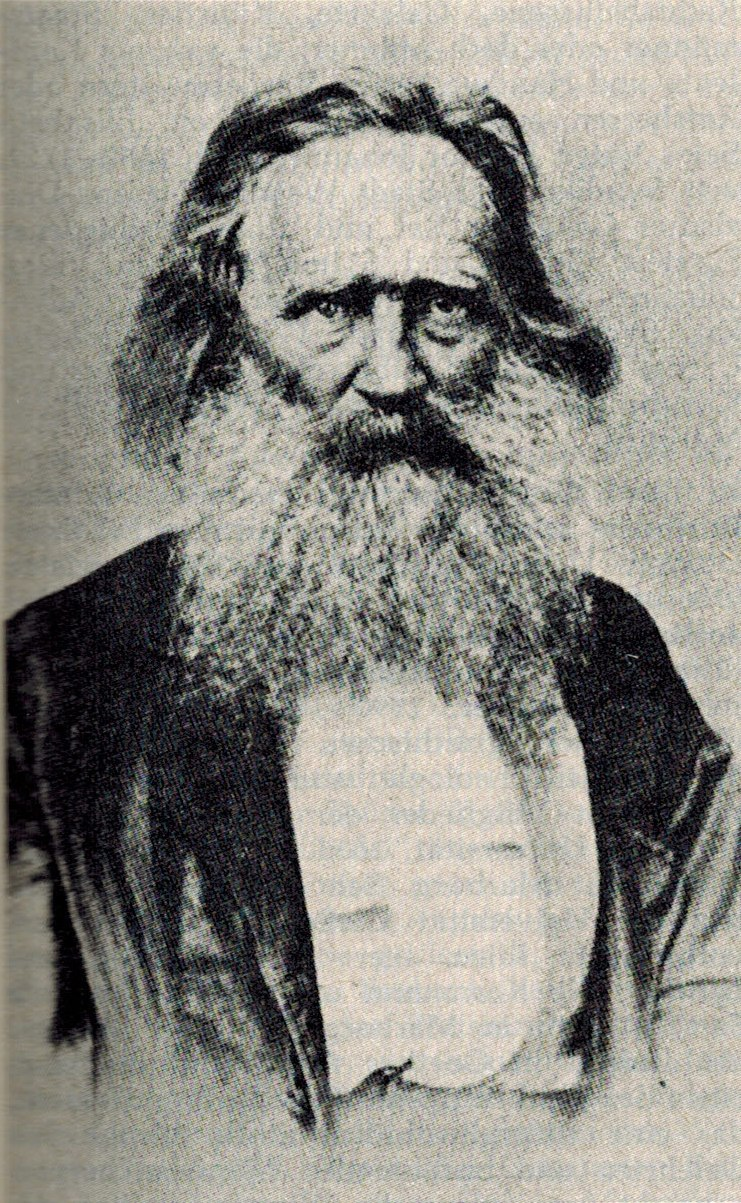
- Ferdinand Lindheimer from Goethe im Lichte der Vererbungslehre (1908)
- Born: May 21, 1801; Free City of Frankfurt, Holy Roman Empire
- Died: December 2, 1879 (aged 78); New Braunfels, Texas, United States
- Resting place: Comal Cemetery
- Education: University of Wiesbaden; University of Jena; University of Bonn.
- Occupation: Botanist
- Known for: Father of Texas Botany
- Spouse: Eleanor Reinartz
- Children: Two sons Two daughters
- Parent(s): Johann Hartmann Lindheimer; Jahnette Magdeline Reisser Lindheimer

Ferdinand Jacob Lindheimer (May 21, 1801 – December 2, 1879) was a German Texan botanist who spent his working life on the American frontier. In 1936, Recorded Texas Historic Landmark number 1590 was placed on Lindheimer's grave.

== Biography ==
=== Early life ===
Ferdinand Jacob Lindheimer was born to merchant Johann Hartmann and Jahnette Magdeline Reisser Lindheimer on May 21, 1801, in Frankfurt, Germany. Lindheimer was educated at the Frankfurt Gymnasium, a Berlin preparatory school, the University of Wiesbaden and the University of Jena. He received a scholarship in Philology at the University of Bonn.

=== Political activism ===
In 1827 Lindheimer became a teacher at the Bunsen Institute in Frankfurt, where he became an active proponent of governmental reform of Germany. He became one of the Dreissiger refugees who left Germany after participation in the failed Frankfurt Putsch insurrection in 1833. In 1834, Lindheimer arrived in Belleville, Illinois, whence he traveled by boat to New Orleans.

=== Texas residency ===
Lindheimer and several companions began traveling to Texas, but were diverted to Mexico where he lived and worked for more than a year. Here he lived in the German colony in Veracruz where he learned about Mexican botany. The German colony in "El Mirador" was founded by Karl Sartorius near a large Italian colony in Huatusco. He spent over a year here with the German migrants in Mexico learning as much about the bountiful Mexican flora. Late in 1835 he departed Mexico as the Texas Revolution was beginning and was shipwrecked on the coast near Mobile, Alabama. Lindheimer headed to Texas and arrived at the San Jacinto battlefield the day after the final battle of the Texas Revolution.

In 1844 he met Prince Carl of Solms-Braunfels, Germany, who was making final arrangements for the settlement of a German colony in Texas, which would be known as New Braunfels, Texas. Lindheimer lived the remainder of his life in New Braunfels.

Meusebach and Hermann Spiess of the Darmstadt Society of Forty chose the location for Bettina in 1847 on the banks of the Llano River. Lindheimer was a botanist residing in this colony. The Fisher–Miller Land Grant commune was named in honor of Bettina von Arnim, an early feminist activist and a personal friend of the Meusebach family.

=== Botanist ===
During the late 1830s and early 1840s, Lindheimer collected botanic specimens in Texas, part of this time for Dr. Asa Gray of Harvard University. With George Engelmann and A. Gray he edited the exsiccata-like series Lindheimer Flora Texana exsiccata. Lindheimer persuaded Wilhelm Bruckisch of the Silesian Beekeepers Society to bring black Italian bees to Texas for pollination of the fruit trees in the Guadalupe River valley.

Lindheimer collected fifteen hundred species in the south Texas area, over a period of thirteen years.

In New Braunfels, Lindheimer began a friendship with fellow botanical enthusiast John O. Meusebach, who appointed him director of a New Braunfels botanical garden. After resigning as Commissioner-General of the Adelsverein, Meusebach moved from New Braunfels to some acreage he had bought at Comanche Springs in Bexar County, believed to be in the vicinity of current-day Camp Bullis. Lindheimer and Meusebach made botanical collections at Comanche Spring, with Lindheimer's 1849 collections bearing the Comanche Spring place tag. After Meusebach retired to Loyal Valley, Lindheimer was a frequent visitor who exchanged botanical specimens for evaluation with Meusebach.

Botanical specimens collected by Lindheimer are held in multiple herbaria, including the Plant Resources Center of the University of Texas at Austin, and the National Herbarium of Victoria (MEL), Royal Botanic Gardens Victoria.

=== Newspaper editor ===
In 1852, Lindheimer was hired as an editor, and along with Adolph Douai, helped found the German-language newspaper known as the Die Neu-Braunfelser Zeitung.

=== Death and legacy ===
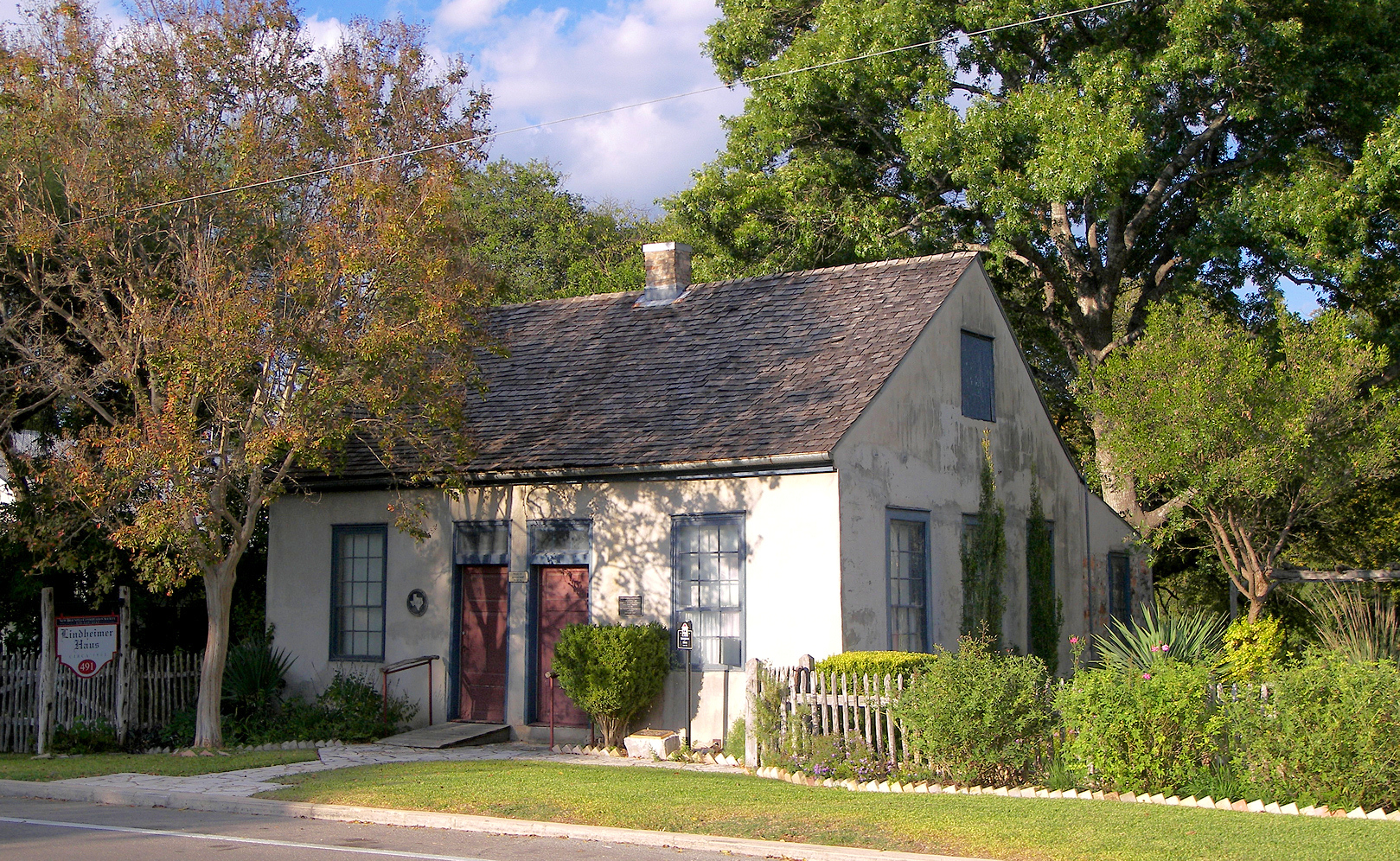
The Lindheimer House, New Braunfels, Texas

Lindheimer died December 2, 1879, in New Braunfels.

He is known as the Father of Texas Botany, with over 20 species and one genus bearing his name.

The Lindheimer House in New Braunfels is preserved as a public museum and operated by the New Braunfels Conservation Society. The house was added to the National Register of Historic Places in 1970.

A subspecies of snake, Pantherophis obsoletus lindheimeri, is named in his honor.

== See also ==
- List of Darmstadt Society of Forty
