= Vormärz =

Period of German history before the 1848 revolution

- 1815/1830–1848
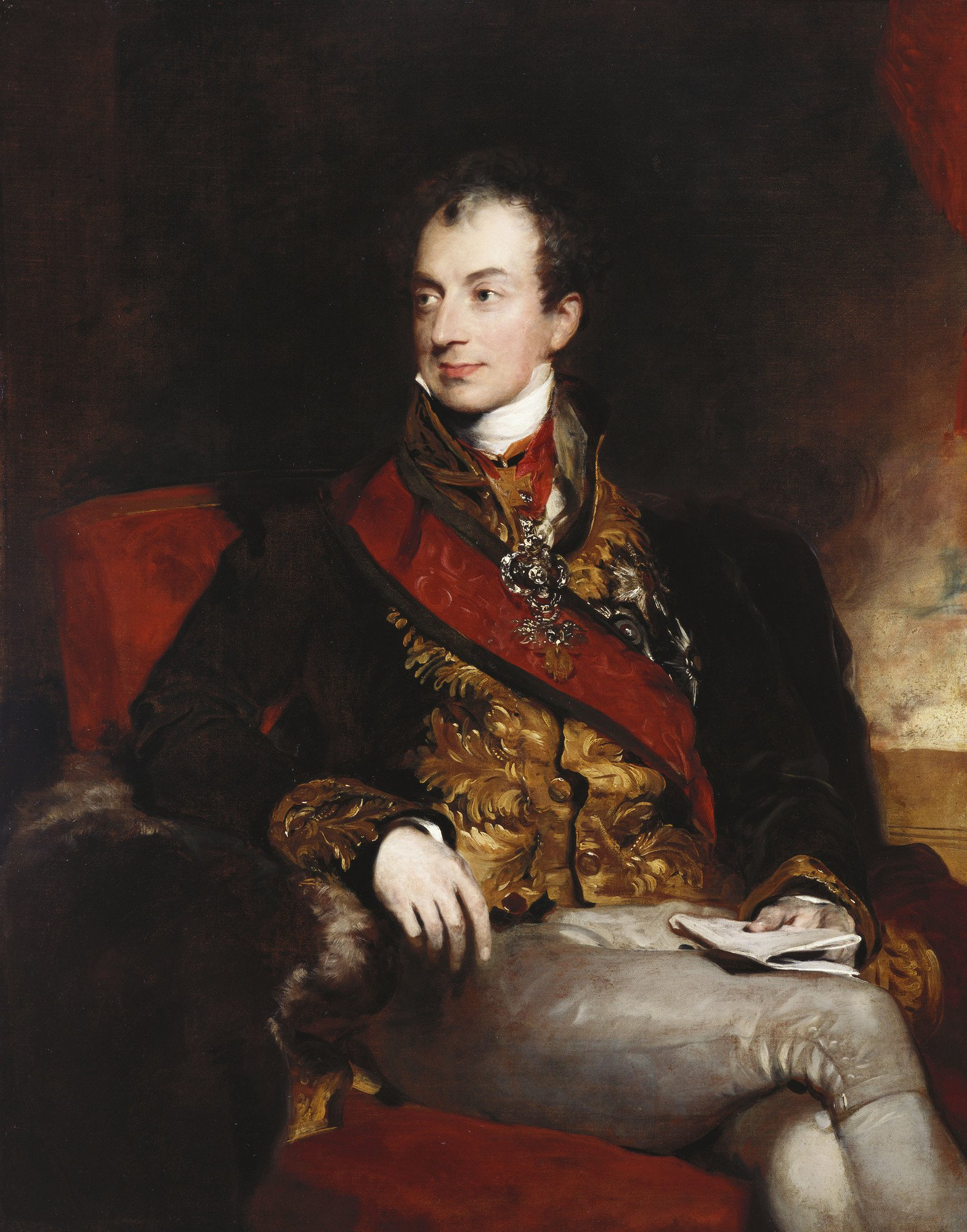
- Chancellor Metternich about 1820, painting by Thomas Lawrence
- Location: German Confederation

Vormärz (German pronunciation: [ˈfoːɐ̯ˌmɛʁts]; English: pre-March) was a period in the history of Germany preceding the 1848 March Revolution in the states of the German Confederation. The beginning of the period is less well-defined. Some place the starting point directly after the fall of Napoleon and the establishment of the German Confederation in 1815. Others, typically those who emphasise the Vormärz as a period of political uprising, place the beginning at the French July Revolution of 1830. The era also saw Germany gradually shifting from an agriculture-based society to an industrial one, during the late Industrial Revolution. This was accompanied by developments in science, literacy, literature and political awareness.

Internationally known as the Age of Metternich, within Germany it was characterized by the dominance of Austria and Prussia in the German Confederation. Both Austria and Prussia established repressive absolutist police states domestically, and pressured other German states to do the same. These authoritarian regimes practiced censorship and mass surveillance on an unprecedented scale in response to even moderate reformist calls for liberalism, constitutional monarchy, and German unification, as well as more radical, revolutionary calls for republicanism and universal suffrage.

Culturally, this period is known as the Biedermeier era. As such it is seen as a conclusion of the Romanticist era.

== Background ==
Upon Napoleon's final defeat at the Battle of Waterloo, the European powers, led by the Austrian state chancellor Klemens von Metternich and British foreign secretary Lord Castlereagh, implemented the Conservative Order, thereby reversing the massive changes brought by the French Revolution. The aim was to reestablish the pre-revolutionary balance of power. Against the nationalist and liberal tendencies among the German bourgeoisie that had risen during the Napoleonic Wars, the German Confederation was established as a successor of the shattered Holy Roman Empire. It was not a nation state but a loose association of the German princes, who agreed on suppressing such political activities of their subjects. The German Confederation ultimately failed. After the "French period" in large German territories including the Rhineland, the implementation of the Napoleonic Code, and the Prussian reforms, the movement towards a constitution and a parliamentary system could be delayed, but not reversed.

Demonstrations grew increasingly visible and strident. Having founded one of the first national Burschenschaft circa 1815, the students of Jena openly demonstrated at the Wartburg Festival, demanding a national pan-German state founded on a liberal constitution. When the 1819 assassination of August von Kotzebue by student activist Karl Ludwig Sand created appropriate pretext, the Bundesversammlung responded to the growing influence of the Burschenschaften by issuing the Carlsbad Decrees, which censored the press, curtailed academic study of liberalism, and restricted public discussion of such ideas as national unity and wider suffrage.

Though many activists like Ernst Moritz Arndt, Hoffmann von Fallersleben, Hans Ferdinand Massmann, Georg Büchner, Fritz Reuter, Friedrich Ludwig Jahn, Carl Theodor Welcker and Friedrich Gottlieb Welcker were arrested or retired into private life, liberal ideals enjoyed resurgence in the French July Revolution of 1830, which was followed by insurrections in the Prussian capital, Berlin, and in the German states of Saxony, Hanover, Hesse, and Brunswick. That same year, as the November Uprising in Congress Poland failed and the consequent emigration of many Polish insurgents began, popular German support for liberalism grew; at the Hambach Festival of 1832, which was a culminating point of the national, liberal, and democratic movement, the national colours of Germany and the Polish flag were raised together. After the Greater Poland Uprising of 1846, the trial against the insurgents around Ludwik Mierosławski at the Berlin Kammergericht gained large interest, and the defendants had to be pardoned by King Frederick William IV of Prussia during the March revolution due to public pressure. However, the liberal and democratic movement included a strong nationalistic element from the beginning, predominantly against the French "hereditary enemy".

The states of the German Confederation reacted by increased suppression. In the failed Frankfurter Wachensturm, an attempt to storm the Bundesversammlung assembly of the princes' delegates, the Free City of Frankfurt was occupied by Austrian and Prussian troops. Many participants were sentenced for high treason; others like Gustav Körner and Ferdinand Lindheimer fled from Germany, mostly to the United States. On the other hand, the establishment of the Prussian-dominated Zollverein customs union, though formed to address economic concerns, was widely seen by national-liberal circles as a decisive step towards a (Lesser) German unification. In 1837 the Göttingen Seven professors were dismissed for their protest against the abolition of the Hanover constitution.

The succession of the mentally handicapped Ferdinand I of Austria to the throne in 1835 made it possible for Metternich to have responsibility of the internal and external affairs of the Austrian Empire. Nationalism and the social developments in the empire created more tensions that would eventually erupt in the form of the March 1848 revolution. The emerging working class was looked at as a political problem, rather than a social one. The rise of liberalism would eventually be the downfall for Metternich and Ferdinand. Liberal ideals were coming from the upper aristocracy and the middle classes. The dissent of the middle class was extremely evident. In Hungary, the 1836-39 Diet saw few gains made, though these were significant to the peasant class. Along with the abolition of serfdom in Hungary, it no longer was a question of class but of the national position and the right of the authority of Vienna. The conflicting ideas would eventually come to a head in the March 1848 revolution.

== Popular music ==
Musically, the Vormärz spanned during the end of the Classical period and the beginning of the Romantic period. Ludwig van Beethoven lead the way during the composers late period. He wrote monumental works like the Missa solemnis and his Symphony No. 9. Franz Schubert another transitional composer wrote over 600 lieder including two famous song cycles; Winterreise and Die schöne Müllerin. The waltz was the most popular dance craze in Europe with composers like Joseph Lanner and Johann Strauss I writing the most celebrated waltzes. Other notable composers from this era include Felix Mendelssohn, Johann Nepomuk Hummel, Carl Maria von Weber, Franz Liszt and Robert Schumann.

== Literary movement ==
Vormärz is also the name of a movement in German literature during the same time, characterized by an increasing interest by authors in political and social topics, including the growing economic unity of Germany through the Zollverein, the topic of German Unification itself, and expanded male suffrage.
