= List of Darmstadt Society of Forty members =

In 1847, Hermann Spiess, Ferdinand Ludwig Herff, and Gustav Schleicher founded the "Darmstädter Vierziger" (the Society of Forty), sometimes referred to as the Socialistic Colony and Society. The founders, as well as many of the members, were from Darmstadt, the capital of the Grand Duchy of Hesse. They originally planned to establish socialistic communes in Wisconsin.

Spiess and Herff were approached in Wiesbaden by Adelsverein vice president and executive secretary-business director Count Carl Frederick Christian of Castell-Castell, who made a deal with them to colonize 200 families on the Fisher–Miller Land Grant territory in Texas. In return, they were to receive $12,000 in money, livestock, and equipment and provisions for a year. After the first year, the colonies were expected to support themselves. The colonies attempted were Castell, Leiningen, Bettina, Schoenburg, and Meerholz in Llano County; Darmstädler Farm in Comal County; and Tusculum in Kendall County. Of these, only two survived: Castell and Tusculum, which was renamed Boerne in 1852. The colonies failed after the Adelsverein funding expired, and because of conflict of structure and authorities. Some members moved to other Adelsverein settlements in Texas; others moved elsewhere, or returned to Germany.

== The Forty ==
The following list is derived from the first-hand account of Louis Reinhardt, as well as other historical records.

Darmstadt Society of Forty
Name	Ship	Notes
Otto Amelung	St. Pauli, July 4, 1847	Lawyer
Heinrich Backofen (circa 1804–1872)	St. Pauli, July 4, 1847	Maker of musical instruments
Peter Bub	St. Pauli, July 4, 1847	Maker of musical instruments
Unknown Deichert		Blacksmith
Christoph Flach	St. Pauli, July 4, 1847	Mechanic
Friedrich Wilhelm von Wrede, Jr.	St. Pauli, July 4, 1847	Wrede School in Gillespie County, Texas was established on his land. He was part of the German negotiating team for the Meusebach–Comanche Treaty. He served in the Texas House of Representatives Nov 7, 1859 - Nov 8, 1861 (Note: Texas became part of the Confederate States of America on March 2, 1861.)
Rudolph Fuchs		Lawyer
Adolph Hahn	St. Pauli, July 4, 1847	Lieutenant of the military
Unknown Heff		Carpenter
Ferdinand Ludwig Herff (1820–1912)	1846	Physician
Unknown Herrmann		Forester
Christian Hesse		Lawyer
Johannes Hoerner		
Louis Kappelhoff		Ship carpenter
Heinrich Kattmann	St. Pauli, July 4, 1847	
Adam Koeppel	St. Pauli, July 4, 1847	
Jacob Kuechler (1823–1893)	St. Pauli, July 4, 1847	Forester
Georg August Lerch	St. Pauli, July 4, 1847	Architect
Ferdinand Lindheimer (1801–1879)	1834	Naturalist
Louis Friedrich	St. Pauli, July 4, 1847	Forester
Unknown Merting		Minister
Friedrich Michel	St. Pauli, July 4, 1847	Brewer
Franz Morde		
Edward Mueller	St. Pauli, July 4, 1847	Agriculturalist
Unknown Neff		Carpenter
Unknown Neff		Butcher
Unknown Ottmer		Miller
Ludwig (Louis) Reinhardt	St. Pauli, July 4, 1847	Botanist
Unknown Rockan		American who joined in Victoria, Texas
Phillipp Friedrich Karl Theodore (Fritz) Schenck (1820–1875)	St. Pauli, July 4, 1847	Forester
Gustav Schleicher (1823–1879)	St. Pauli, July 4, 1847	Engineer
Theodore Schlenning	St. Pauli, July 4, 1847	Physician
Leopold Schulz		Physician
Anton Schunk		Maker of musical instruments
Hermann Spiess (c.1818–1873)		Co-founder of the Bettina, Texas, commune in 1847, he became commissioner-general of the Adelsverein after the resignation of John O. Meusebach.
August Strauss	St. Pauli, July 4, 1847	Mechanic
Adam Vogt (1822–1882)	St. Pauli, July 4, 1847	Forester; signed the petition to create Kendall County; first Judge of Kendall County
Julius Wagner	St. Pauli, July 4, 1847	Lawyer
Karl Wundt		Lawyer
Philip Zoeller (1818–1900)	St. Pauli, July 4, 1847	Architect who designed the Kendall County Courthouse.

== Source material ==
- King, Irene Marschall (1967). John O.Meusebach. University of Texas Press. ISBN 978-0-292-73656-6.
- Morgenthaler, Jefferson (2005). Boerne, Settlement on the Cibolo. Mockingbird Books. ISBN 978-1-932801-08-8.
- Morgenthaler, Jefferson (2007). The German Settlement of the Texas Hill Country. Mockingbird Books. ISBN 978-1-932801-09-5.
- Pioneers in God's Hills. Gillespie County Historical Society. 1960.
- Reichstein, Andreas (2001). German Pioneers on the American Frontier: The Wagners in Texas and Illinois. University of North Texas Press. ISBN 978-1-57441-134-8.
- Sowell, Andrew Jackson (2010) [1900]. Early Settlers and Indian Fighters of Southwest Texas. General Books LLC. ISBN 978-1-4590-6750-9 – via HathiTrust.
