= Ferdinand Ludwig Herff =

German-American physician

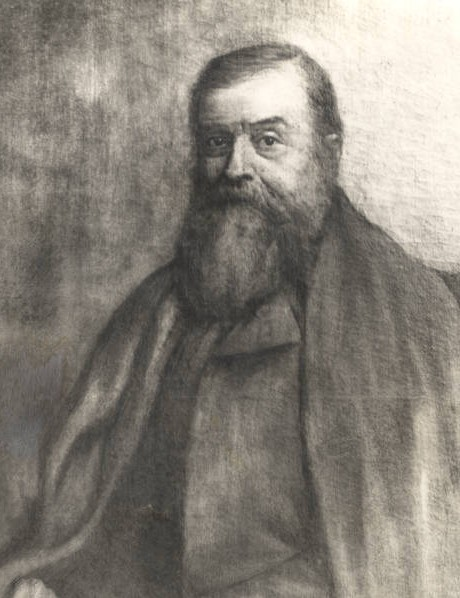
- Born: Ferdinand Ludwig von Herff; November 29, 1820; Darmstadt, Grand Duchy of Hesse
- Died: May 18, 1912 (aged 91); San Antonio, United States
- Resting place: San Antonio City Cemetery #1
- Citizenship: United States
- Education: University of Berlin; University of Bonn; University of Giessen
- Occupation: Physician
- Spouse: Mathilde Klingelhoeffer
- Children: 6
- Relatives: John O. Meusebach

Ferdinand Ludwig Herff (1820–1912) was a 19th-century German-born physician who emigrated to Texas and became a medical pioneer in San Antonio. He was one of the co-founders of the Bettina commune. In 1982, Recorded Texas Historic Landmark 1268 was placed on Malakopf Mountain in Boerne, to honor Herff. His homesite in San Antonio was designated a Recorded Texas Historic Landmark in the year 2000, Marker number 12345.

== Early life ==
Ferdinand Ludwig von Herff was born November 29, 1820, in Darmstadt, Grand Duchy of Hesse, to Christian von Herff, Privy Councillor or Judge of the Supreme Court of Hesse-Darmstadt, and his wife Eleanora von Meusebach, a cousin of John O. Meusebach.

== Education ==
Herff attended the University of Berlin and the University of Bonn, where his uncle Doctor von Rehfuss was the president of the university. Both universities were the alma maters of Karl Marx. A fellow student was Frederick III, future King of Prussia at the Bonn university. The family social circle included naturalist Alexander von Humboldt and Prince Albert of Saxe-Coburg and Gotha. Herff completed his medical education at the University of Giessen in 1843. Upon graduation, he served a surgical internship with the army of Hesse, and learned techniques in plastic surgery and the treatment of tuberculosis.

== Texas ==
=== Bettina ===
Herff, Gustav Schleicher and Hermann Spiess founded the Socialistic Colony and Society, or Die Vierziger (the Society of Forty), which originally had plans to establish socialistic communes in Wisconsin. Spiess and Herff were approached in Wiesbaden by Adelsverein Vice President and Executive Secretary-Business Director Count Carl Frederick Christian of Castell-Castell, who made a deal with them to colonize two hundred families on the Fisher–Miller Land Grant territory in Texas. In return, they were to receive $12,000 in money, livestock, equipment and provisions for a year. After the first year, the colony was expected to support itself. In 1846, Herff and Spiess emigrated together to the United States via New York City. From there, they traveled by railroad to Wheeling, West Virginia, and by stage coach to New Orleans. They then boarded a ship to Galveston. Spiess went to New Braunfels, and Herff went to Indianola at the end of April 1847 to await the arrival of the other colony members. John O. Meusebach and Spiess chose the location for Bettina in 1847 on the banks of the Llano River. The commune was named in honor of Bettina von Arnim, an early feminist activist and a personal friend of the Meusebach family. The majority of the Bettina settlers arrived in August 1847. Beneath an oak tree, Herff removed a cataract from the eye of a local Indian chief. Jacob Kuechler was one of the notables at the commune. Bettina failed after the Adelsverein funding expired, and due to conflict of structure and authorities. Some members moved to other Adelsverein settlements in Texas. Others moved elsewhere, or returned to Germany.

Herff returned to Germany for an additional period of service with the Hesse army, to learn techniques in treating battle casualties. While there, Herff was able to observe the correlation between a surgeon's attention to sanitation, and the low rate of patient infection.

=== San Antonio ===
During his sojourn in his home country, Herff married his fiancee Mathilde Klingelhoeffer. Herff and his new wife re-emigrated to Texas. Herff Americanized his name by dropping the "von", and became a citizen. After a brief period of life in New Braunfels, Herff established a home and a medical practice in San Antonio in 1850. He served as City Alderman 1850–1851. Herff pioneered the use of chloroform as early as 1854. A number of his patients were indigent, but Herff dedicated his career to caring for the patient regardless of financial circumstances. Herff was personal physician to Richard King, founder of the King Ranch.

In 1853, he became a charter member of the Texas Medical Association. Herff strived to elevate the standards of medical practice, and was San Antonio health officer in 1860. Like many Germans, Herff was a supporter of the Union in the Civil War; however, he served as Confederate States Army surgeon, treating the patient not the uniform. He helped the Sisters of Charity of the Incarnate Word establish Santa Rosa Infirmary, San Antonio's first hospital.

== Personal life and death ==
Herff married Mathilde Klingelhoeffer in 1849. The couple had six children. He spent his vacations with his family, touring Yellowstone National Park and other parts of the United States, as well as journeys to Europe. The Herff family owned 960 acres on two different tracts in Boerne, Texas, which they used as personal retreats. The acreage has now been incorporated into the Cibolo Nature Center and the Kendall County Fair Association. Mrs. and Mrs. Herff were lifelong friends with Texas State Senator James Rodgers Loughridge.

Ferdinand Ludwig Herff died in San Antonio on May 18, 1912, and is buried in San Antonio City Cemetery No. 1.

In 1982, Recorded Texas Historic Landmark 1268 was placed on Malakopf Mountain in Boerne, to honor Herff. Herff's homesite in San Antonio was designated a Recorded Texas Historic Landmark in the year 2000, Marker number 12345.

== Legacy ==
- May 1, 1905, the Bexar County Society unveiled a bust of Dr. Herff at the Carnegie Library in San Antonio.
- Ferdinand Herff Elementary School in San Antonio.

== See also ==
- Boerne, Texas
- Herff-Rozelle Farm

== Sources ==
- King, Irene Marschall (1967). John O. Meusebach. University of Texas Press. ISBN 978-0-292-73656-6.
