= John O. Meusebach =

American politician (1812–1897)

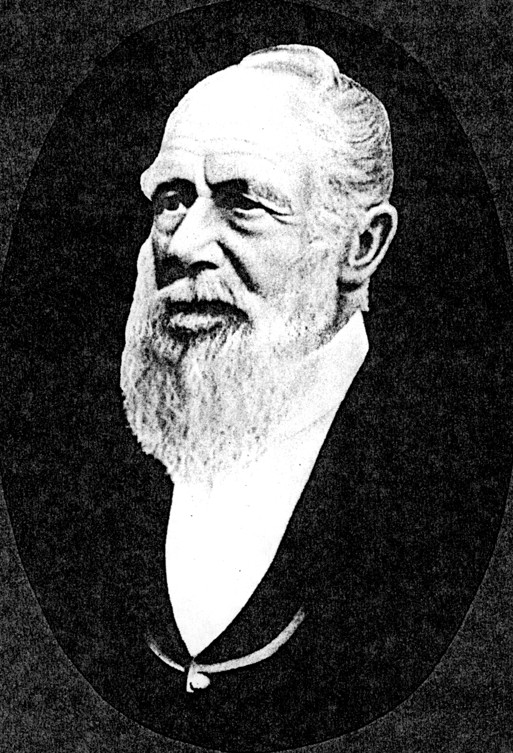

Texas Senate, District 22
- In office 1851–1853
- Preceded by: Benjamin Rush Wallace
- Succeeded by: William Harrison Martin

Personal details
- Born: May 26, 1812 Dillenburg, Duchy of Nassau
- Died: May 27, 1897 (aged 85) Loyal Valley, Texas, US
- Resting place: Loyal Valley Cemetery
- Spouse: Countess Agnes of Coreth (1835–1909)
- Children: Ernst Otfried (1853); Otto (1855); Max Rudolf (1857); Antonie (1859); Elizabeth (1862); Johanne and Francisca (1864); Lucy (1865); Emmy and Lilly 1st (1868); Lilly 2nd (1872)

John O. Meusebach (born Otfried Hans Freiherr von Meusebach; May 26, 1812 – May 27, 1897) was a Prussian-born American bureaucrat and politician who served in Texas Senate, District 22.

== Early years ==
Meusebach was born May 26, 1812, in Dillenburg, Duchy of Nassau, to Baron Karl Hartwig Gregor von Meusebach, a judge solicitor, and Ernestine von Meusebach née von Witzleben. He was the namesake of brother Orfried Isador (1806–1808) who died young. He had two older sisters, Ludowine and Caroline, and a younger brother Carl Bernhard. The children grew up in a home filled with music. Mother Ernestine was a pianist, and the family enjoyed entertaining visitors with the singing of poems, folk songs and hymns. The elder Meusebach, a poet himself, took delight in collecting German folk music and literature.

As an adult, Meusebach stood 6 foot 2 inches tall with reddish-blonde hair. Waco Indians near New Braunfels called him Ma-be-quo-si-to-mu, (Chief with the burning hair of the head). Penateka Comanche Chief Ketemoczy (Katemcy) named him El Sol Colorado (The Red Sun).

== Education and career ==
In 1828, the Meusebach sons were enrolled in parochial school in Roßleben, and at the Mining and Forest Academy at Clausthal-Zellerfeld in the Harz mountains to study geology and the natural sciences. During this period, grandfather Christian Carl von Meusebach in Vockstedt took the young men on outdoor excursions to share their common interest in botany. Otfried enrolled in the University of Bonn in 1832, majoring in law, cameralism, and finance. He transferred to the University of Halle, where he studied natural science. In 1836, he passed his bar examination at Naumburg.

Meusebach was appointed administrator of Trier in 1836. He became an assistant judge in 1838 at Berlin and Potsdam. The Meusebach home was a gathering place for intellectual and political discussions of personal freedom and less government versus a nationalist state. Otfried was interested that some German intellectuals had emigrated to the United States, but also voiced opinions that the United States was in contradiction of itself by proclaiming liberty while allowing the institution of slavery. In 1841, Meusebach held a legal position in Stettin. Because of his expertise at handling a dispute between Stettin and Anklam, he was soon appointed as Bürgermeister of Anklam.

== Adelsverein ==
=== Texas land grant ===
The Adelsverein was formed in Biebrich, Germany on April 20, 1842, by a group of noblemen to promote German colonization in Texas. Co-founder Count Victor August of Leiningen-Westerburg-Alt-Leiningen was president of the society, and Count Carl of Castell-Castell became vice-president and business director.

The Republic of Texas issued colonization land grants totaling 4,494,806 acres. These grants were with individuals and conditional upon said individuals establishing settlements in a stated geographical area of Texas, and were limited to a given time period in which the colonization had to take place. On June 7, 1842, Henry Francis Fisher and Burchard Miller received a colonization land grant to settle 1,000 immigrant families of German, Dutch, Swiss, Danish, Swedish, and Norwegian ancestry, known as the Fisher–Miller Land Grant. The contract was renewed on September 1, 1843 by the Republic of Texas House of Representatives. On June 26, 1844, Fisher sold an interest in the grant to the Adelsverein. On December 30, 1845, both Fisher and Miller sold their grant rights to the Adelsverein, conditional that Fisher be on the Verein's colonial committee. On April 7, 1844, a second land grant acquired by the Verein was the Bourgeois-Ducos grant, which had actually expired December 3, 1843. The Verein appointed the grant's namesake Alexander Bourgeois d'Orvanne as Colonial Director, who sold them on the promise he could get the grant's deadline extended. In the end, the Bourgeois-Ducos grant was not extended.

=== Commissioner-General ===
On October 24, 1844, Meusebach wrote a letter to Count Castell to express his interest in moving to the Republic of Texas in order to pursue his love of geology, botany and horticulture. He had become fascinated by Texas and had been reading everything about the area. At the suggestion of his brother Carl, he read Texas: The Rise, Progress, and Prospects of the Republic of Texas by author William Kennedy and became intrigued by a place named Enchanted Rock.

The same book had inspired Prince Carl of Solms-Braunfels who had been named Commissioner-General of the Verein's colonization. Once in Texas, Prince Solms had become disillusioned because of the financial and logistics difficulties of establishing German colonies in Texas. Fisher had badly mis-managed funds and assets entrusted to him, with Prince Solms lending more money to the expedition. In 1844, Prince Solms asked the Vereins to remove him as Commissioner-General and appoint a successor.

Count Castell replied to Meusebach's October 24 letter by stating that he could buy a share in the Verein for $2,000 and have a chance at becoming Commissioner-General in Texas. The two negotiated a contract for Commissioner-General: Meusebach would receive a $2,000 allowance for equipment and books, an annual salary of $790 plus 2% of the net profits of the Verein, and 500 acres of land in Texas. Before departing, he paid a courtesy call on Prince Frederick of Prussia to secure his support of the effort. Meusebach signed the contract on February 24, 1845 and paid his $2,000 membership fee. Count Castell was vague and evasive in response to Meusebach's questions about the particulars of the colonization endeavor, but gave Meusebach a $10,000 letter of credit.

Meusebach added Texas Forever to Tenax Propositi (Perseverance in Purpose) on his family crest. The 32-year-old Meusebach traveled to Liverpool, England to board the steamship Cambria to Boston. As the ship departed, he renounced his title of Baron, as a symbol of his new life in a new land. Upon arrival in Boston on March 14, 1845, he headed to Pittsburgh and boarded a boat for a trip down the Ohio River and then Mississippi River. He arrived in New Orleans on April 10, 1845. From New Orleans, he arrived by boat in Galveston, Texas on May 1, 1845.

Verein agent D.H. Klaener greeted Meusebach's arrival at Galveston and immediately apprised him of the desperate straits of the colonists. The finances were in disarray, due to Prince Solms' lack of business experience and his refusal to keep financial records. To a larger degree, the financial situation happened because the Adelsverein was an organization of noblemen with no practical backgrounds at running a business. They were on the other side of the world and did not witness the situation both Prince Solms and Meusebach were dealing with. Henry Fisher had not supplied transport and supplies for which the Verein advanced money to him. Fisher had also conspired in February 1845 with Dr. F. Schubbert to coerce incoming immigrants to sign legal documents disassociating themselves from the Verein and to join Schubbert's colony in Milam County.

Meusebach found Carlshafen (Indianola) to be insufficient as a port of entry, and the route to New Braunfels isolated. He was told Prince Solms chose to keep the Germans from interacting with any Americans. Meusebach found Prince Solms in Galveston trying to return to Germany, detained by authorities for unpaid bills. Meusebach made a full accounting of the situation to the Verein, adding that he felt the less the Verein had to do with Henry Fisher and Burchard Miller the better off everyone would be.

In May 1846, Meusebach received a letter from Count Castell informing him 4,304 emigrants were on their way to Texas, with the Verein unresponsive to pleas for more funding. Embarrassed by a German media story from Klaener, the Verein established a $60,000 letter of credit. The amount was not adequate for sustaining the total amount of German emigrants in Texas, but Castell also sent Philip Cappes as Special Commissioner to observe the situation. Cappes had also been instructed by Castell to observe Meusebach and to secretly report back every detail. By the time Cappes departed in March 1847, he recommended another $200,000 be advanced.

=== Carlshafen (Indianola) ===
Carlshafen (Indianola) was the port of entry chosen by Prince Solms.

=== New Braunfels ===
New Braunfels was founded by Prince Carl of Solms-Braunfels on March 21, 1845. On May 15, 1845, Prince Solms left for Germany and turned the leadership of the settlement over to Meusebach.

=== Fredericksburg ===
Meusebach planned the 1846 establishment of Fredericksburg, Texas for the Adelsverein.

=== Penateka Comanche peace treaty ===
In order to settle the Fisher-Miller land grant, Meusebach successfully negotiated a non-government peace treaty with the Penateka Comanche in 1847.

=== Darmstadt Society of Forty ===
Meusebach and Hermann Spiess of the Darmstadt Society of Forty chose the location for Bettina in 1847 on the banks of the Llano River. The commune was named in honor of Bettina von Arnim, a personal friend of the Meusebach family.

=== Nassau Plantation ===
In 1843, the Vereins purchased a 4,428 acre plantation in Fayette County and named it after the Archduke of Nassau. Twenty-five slaves were bought to work on the property. When Prince Solms inspected the plantation in 1844, he recommended the Verein divest itself of the property, rather than be associated with slavery. The Vereins operated the property for five years.

=== Resignation from Adelsverein ===
Meusebach had considered leaving Texas as early as November 1845, when he wrote to Count Castell and announced his intention to resign and return to Germany. Meusebach did not feel the Adelsverein was organized enough to achieve its goals. He had survived a hanging mob at his doorstep in New Braunfels on December 31, 1846. The incident had been stirred up by Henry Francis Fisher in an attempt to usurp Meusebach's power. Meusebach was the target of intrigue instigated by Count Castell, who sent his friend Philip Cappes to Texas ostensibly as Special Commissioner to provide additional funding, but in reality to secretly observe Meusebach to find cause to oust him. In January 1847 in Fredericksburg, Meusebach was again the target of a coup d'état, this time instigated by Dr. Friedrich Schubbert. He again submitted his resignation to accompany a financial report to Castell on January 23, 1847. The effective date of his resignation was July 20, 1847. Hermann Spiess was named his successor.

== Texas State Senator ==
In 1851, Meusebach made a return trip to Germany to spend time with his remaining family. His father had died in 1847. During the trip, he also took the opportunity to completely sever any remaining ties to the Adelsverein. While in Germany, Meusebach had been elected to represent Bexar, Medina and Comal counties in the Texas State Senate.

Meusebach took office on November 7, 1851. His first act as Texas senator was to request that the inaugural address of Governor Peter Hansborough Bell be printed in English, Spanish and German. He served on the Committee on State Affairs and the Committee on Education.

== Special state commissioner ==
In 1854, Meusebach was appointed by Governor Elisha Pease as a special commissioner to settle colonist titles to land promised by the Verein between 1845 and 1846. The Republic of Texas had originally promised the colonists 640 acres apiece for a married couple, or 320 acres for unmarried colonists. When the original colonists settled on their promised acreage, the Verein had kept one half of the allotment. Meusebach's position was to rectify the land holdings. He issued 729 colonist land scripts in the amount of 324,160 acres. Three other Texas General Land Office commissioners also issued scripts, for the aggregate total of 1,735,200 acres in colonist land holdings.

== Comanche Spring, Fredericksburg and New Braunfels residences ==
After resigning as Commissioner-General of the Adelsverein, Meusebach moved from New Braunfels to some 2,577 acres he had bought for $2600 at Comanche Spring in Bexar County, believed to have been in the vicinity of current-day Camp Bullis. In New Braunfels, botanist Ferdinand Lindheimer began a friendship with fellow botanical enthusiast Meusebach, who appointed him director of a New Braunfels botanical garden. Lindheimer and Meusebach made botanical collections at Comanche Spring, with Lindheimer's 1849 collections bearing the Comanche Spring place tag.

During the American Civil War, Meusebach sold his Comanche Spring property and moved to Fredericksburg, where he operated a mercantile business to support his family.

In 1867, he sold his Fredericksburg holdings and moved his family to Waco Springs, four miles north of New Braunfels. On September 12, 1869 a tornado destroyed the Meusebach home in New Braunfels. Meusebach, whose foot had been pinned beneath a heavy beam, was the only member of his family to be injured. The foot injury remained with him the rest of his life.

== Personal life and death ==
Meusebach became engaged to Elizabeth von Hardenberg in 1842. Before they could be married, she died in Germany of Typhoid fever while he was administering the establishments of New Braunfels and Fredericksburg.

On September 28, 1852, forty-year-old Meusebach married seventeen-year-old Austrian-born Countess Agnes of Coreth, daughter of his friend Count Ernst of Coreth. The couple had eleven children, but only seven lived to adulthood.

Meusebach died on May 27, 1897, on his property in Loyal Valley, and is buried in the family cemetery in Cherry Spring.

John and Agnes' daughter Elizabeth married Leo Burchheardt Zesch and had two daughters named Leonie (1882–1944) and Leota (1886–1979) . The family moved to California after Leota's birth, and was living in San Francisco at the time of the 1906 San Francisco earthquake. Leonie von Meusebach–Zesch became a dentist, living in both Texas and Arizona and providing dental services to military personnel. In Arizona she provided dental services to Hopi people. She relocated to Alaska and became a traveling dentist who served remote areas around the state. When her mother Elizabeth was no longer able to care for herself, Dr. Zesch returned to California and spent the rest of her life and career there. The Alaska Women's Hall of Fame inducted Dr. Leonie von Meusebach-Zesch in 2012.

Barons Creek in Fredericksburg, Texas is named after Baron Meusebach.

== See also ==
- Cherry Spring, Texas
- German Texan

== Notes ==
Texas Senate
Preceded by Benjamin Rush Wallace	Texas State Senator from District 22 (Fredericksburg); 1851–1853	Succeeded by William Harrison Martin
