= Clean Divorce =

The "Clean Divorce" (German: Reinliche Scheidung) is the organisational separation between football along with other modern sports and gymnastics, which took place in Germany in 1923 and 1924. Within the German Reich Committee for Physical Exercise, it was no longer possible for clubs to be dual members of specialised sports associations such as the German Football Association and the German Gymnastics Association. As a result, numerous gymnastics clubs split into pure gymnastics clubs on the one hand and other sports clubs such as football clubs on the other.

== Relationship between gymnastics and football ==
One of the early points of contention between gymnasts and other athletes was the question of the nature of competition. In 1891, the German Gymnastics Association openly condemned gymnastics for medals and prizes. As a result, individual competitions were initially replaced by team competitions (club versus club). Finally, the competition was completely abolished at the German Gymnastics Festival. At the same time, Adolf Spieß's so-called free and organised exercises replaced apparatus gymnastics. Gymnastics became unattractive for young people and they turned to sports modelled on the English model. Football in particular became a competitor. The acceptance of football in the military also contributed to this, where it became part of officer training in Germany from 1905.

During World War I, there was a rapprochement between gymnasts and sportsmen. In the economic hardship of the immediate post-war period, there were even mergers, for example in Bielefeld between the 1st Bielefeld Football Club Arminia and the Turngemeinde von 1848 to form TG Arminia Bielefeld. In 1920, the German Gymnastics Association then allowed the football sections of its clubs to participate in the German Football Championships. This resulted in further mergers, which in many places led to "gymnastics and sports clubs" (TSV, TuS, TuSpo, TuRa, TSG or STG).

== Conflict about the professional association system ==
The conflict between gymnasts and athletes broke out again on 28 November 1920, when some sports associations called on the German Gymnastics Association to agree to a professional association system. This would have reduced the German Gymnastics Association to a purely specialised association. It therefore rejected the request. In February 1921, a compromise was reached on dual membership: the playing sections of gymnastics clubs could also take part in the championships of the sports associations. However, as the gymnasts had lost a third of their members since 1918, the gymnastics association soon wanted to abolish dual membership again. On 13 April 1922, it unilaterally terminated the agreement. The sports associations responded by excluding the games sections of gymnastics clubs from their competitions. It was most problematic for those sports that were represented to a greater extent in both gymnastics and sports clubs. Athletics were already being practised as popular exercises in gymnastics clubs when the athletics coming from England with English weights and measures was not yet widespread. Athletes always competed at mountain gymnastics festivals (Bergturnfest), and German gymnastics champions were better performers in some disciplines (sprint, multisport) than those in athletics. The separation therefore hurt both sides.

== Clean Divorce ==
After the sports associations rejected the compromise of founding a joint German Federation for Physical Exercise, the Turnerschaft unilaterally announced the "clean divorce" between gymnastics and other sports on the 1st of September 1923. By the 1st of November, the gymnastics sections had to choose between membership of either the sports association or the gymnastics club. While the gymnastics association lost around 25,000 football-playing members as a result, most football sections remained affiliated to the German Football Association.

The result was the separation of numerous clubs as early as 1923, but mostly in 1924. The playing sections such as football, handball and other team sports separated from the gymnasts and became independent. This is how FC Schalke 04, which separated from TuS 1877 Schalke or FC St. Pauli, when the football section of Hamburg-St. Pauli TV 1862, founded in 1910, became independent. In contrast, Eimsbütteler TV, for example, left the gymnastics club completely.

In some cases, there were also dual structures. For example, some of the Harburger TB 1865 footballers founded the SV Harburg, which took part in German Football Association competitions. However, Harburger TB 1865 also continued to have a football department. Like the other 676 football departments remaining in the German Gymnastics Association, this took part in the gymnasts' football championship.

While the separation was not very successful for football from a gymnastics perspective, things were much better for swimming, which had also been organised by a national association since 1886: "Here, the German Gymnastics Association was able to build up a veritable parallel world for more than a decade before the development was completely halted in 1935 by political intervention from outside," the swimming journalist Wolfgang Philipps explains in a study.

== End of the separation ==
The conflict was officially settled in Berlin in 1930 with the conclusion of an agreement between the German Football Association, German Gymnastics Association and the German Sports Authority for Athletics. From 1931, the German Gymnastics Association no longer organised its own football and athletics championships. Under the government of the NSDAP in 1933, the synchronisation of the gymnastics and sports movement was also part of the political programme. While the Workers' Sport Movement with the communist Combat Community for Red Sports and the social democratic Arbeiter-Turn- und Sportbund was first broken up and then the denominational associations: Deutsche Jugendkraft and Oak Cross were disbanded, the German Imperial Sports Movement was finally dissolved on the 10th May. The German Reich Committee for Physical Exercise was finally dissolved on the 10th May and the individual professional associations were subordinated to the Reich Sports Leader Hans von Tschammer und Osten. From this moment on, the football sections of the gymnastics clubs took part in a standardised German championship like all other football clubs. Some football departments of gymnastics clubs that had become independent as a result of the clean divorce returned to their parent clubs, such as SV Harburg to Harburger TB 1865.

== Literature ==
- Becker, Hartmut: Die Reinliche Scheidung. Versuch einer Trennung von Turnen und Sport in den Jahren 1921–1924. In: Ders. (Hrsg.): Für einen humanen Sport. Gesammelte Beiträge zum Sportethos und zur Geschichte des Sports. Schorndorf 1995, S. 98–109.
- Loose, Hans: Die geschichtliche Entwicklung der Leibesübungen in Deutschland. Der Kampf zwischen Turnen und Sport. Phil. Diss. Leipzig 1924.
- Philipps, Wolfgang: Sportliche Parallelwelten: Turnerschwimmen in der Weimarer Republik. In: Christian Becker u. a. (Hrsg.): Geschichte des Turnens in Norddeutschland. Münster u. a. 2017 (Schriftenreihe des Niedersächsischen Instituts für Sportgeschichte e. V. – Wissenschaftliche Reihe, Bd. 25), S. 143–169.
