= Gustav Schleicher =

American politician (1823–1879)

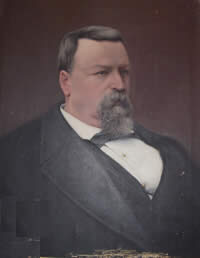

Member of the U.S. House of Representatives from Texas's 6th district
- In office March 4, 1875 – January 10, 1879
- Preceded by: Asa H. Willie
- Succeeded by: Christopher C. Upson

Personal details
- Born: November 19, 1823 Darmstadt, Grand Duchy of Hesse
- Died: January 10, 1879 (aged 55) Washington, D.C., U.S.
- Party: Democratic
- Spouse: Elizabeth Tinsley Howard
- Profession: Engineer

Gustav Schleicher (sometimes spelled Gustave) (November 19, 1823 – January 10, 1879) was a German-born Democratic United States representative from Texas. He was an engineer who served briefly in the Texas legislature, and was a veteran of the Confederate Army.

== Early life ==
Schleicher was born in Darmstadt in the German principality of Hesse in 1823. He attended the Giessen University and studied engineering. He assisted in the construction of early railroads in Europe.

He, Hermann Spiess and Dr. Ferdinand Ludwig Herff were among the leaders in a group of intellectuals who immigrated to Texas and founded a Fisher–Miller Land Grant commune, named Bettina after the German literary figure and social visionary Bettina von Arnim, on the banks of the Llano River in 1847. According to the Handbook of Texas Online,"The community was intended to prove the truth of communist ideals and light the way for relief of the troubles in Europe, which had led to sporadic attempts at revolution and were later to lead to the abortive German revolt of 1848."

== Texas politics and American Civil War ==
Schleicher became disillusioned with the experiment in Bettina (he is said to have remarked that "the bigger the men, the more they talked, the less they worked and the more they ate.") and moved to San Antonio. In San Antonio, he worked with others to begin the Guadalupe Bridge Company to build a toll bridge across the Guadalupe River on the main road between San Antonio and New Braunfels. He also was instrumental in forming the San Antonio and Mexican Gulf Railroad and he began to build a railroad from Port Lavaca to San Antonio with Gen. Joseph E. Johnston who was stationed in Texas.

In 1852, Schleicher became an American citizen and was elected to the Texas House of Representatives, where he served one term in the Fifth Texas Legislature. From 1854—1861 Schleicher was surveyor of the Bexar Land District, which included most of the area from San Antonio to El Paso. During this time he acquired title to extensive land holdings on the Edwards Plateau. In 1856, Schleicher married Elizabeth Tinsley Howard. Beginning in 1858, he and his brother-in-law, Heinrich Dresel, published the San Antonio German-language newspaper the Texas Staats-Zeitung. Schleicher was a cofounder of the San Antonio Water Company in 1858 and of Alamo College in 1860.

He was elected to the Texas Senate in 1859 representing the 31st District which comprised territory west of San Antonio: Gillespie, Medina, and Uvalde Counties. Like most German immigrants, Schleicher opposed Texas's secession from the Union. However, after his adopted state joined the Confederacy, Schleicher became a captain in the Confederate Army, in charge of Gen. John B. Magruder's Corps of Engineers.

== After the war and service in Congress ==
Schleicher practiced law in San Antonio when the Civil War was over and resumed his work in developing railroads. He is listed as one of the incorporators of the Columbus, San Antonio and Rio Grande Railroad and served as engineer for the construction of the Gulf, Western Texas and Pacific Railway, which ran from Indianola, Texas to Cuero, Texas. According to the Handbook of Texas Online, "He founded the latter town as a way-station and moved to it soon afterward, in 1872."

In 1874, he was elected to Congress representing the 6th District when it was drawn for the first time. He was reelected to two additional terms and served as a member of the Ways and Means Committee, the Foreign Affairs Committee and then as Chairman of the House Canals and Railroads Committee.

His activities in support of the gold standard gained him a challenger within the Democratic primary in the person of John Ireland, and Schleicher had to wage a bitter campaign before being nominated and reelected in 1878. He died on January 10, 1879, two months before the start of his third term. A memorial address by the Republican floor leader James A. Garfield was more than a courtesy for a deceased junior member of the opposition party, and attested to the depth of feeling for Schleicher.

He was buried in the San Antonio National Cemetery.

== Memorials ==
- Schleicher County, Texas was named for Gustav Schleicher.

== See also ==
- List of members of the United States Congress who died in office (1790–1899)

Texas House of Representatives
Preceded by unknown	Member of the Texas House of Representatives from District 71 (San Antonio); 1853–1855	Succeeded by unknown
Texas Senate
Preceded by Samuel Maverick	Texas State Senator from District 31 (Uvalde); 1859–1861	Succeeded by Erastus Reed
U.S. House of Representatives
Preceded by Asa H. Willie	Member of the U.S. House of Representatives from Texas's 6th congressional district 1875–1879	Succeeded by Christopher C. Upson
