= Burchard Miller =

Burchard Miller, was one of the many persons interested in the 1840s in securing land grants from the Republic of Texas for colonization enterprises. Miller was also known at Burkart Mueller of Houston.

On February 8, 1842, he joined Henry Francis Fisher and Joseph Baker in an application to Republic of Texas President Sam Houston for a grant of land between the Llano and Colorado rivers on which to settle 1,000 families of German, Dutch, Swiss, Norwegian, Swedish, and Danish immigrants. He was a key party in the Fisher–Miller Land Grant.
