= Adelsverein =

Germany colony in Texas

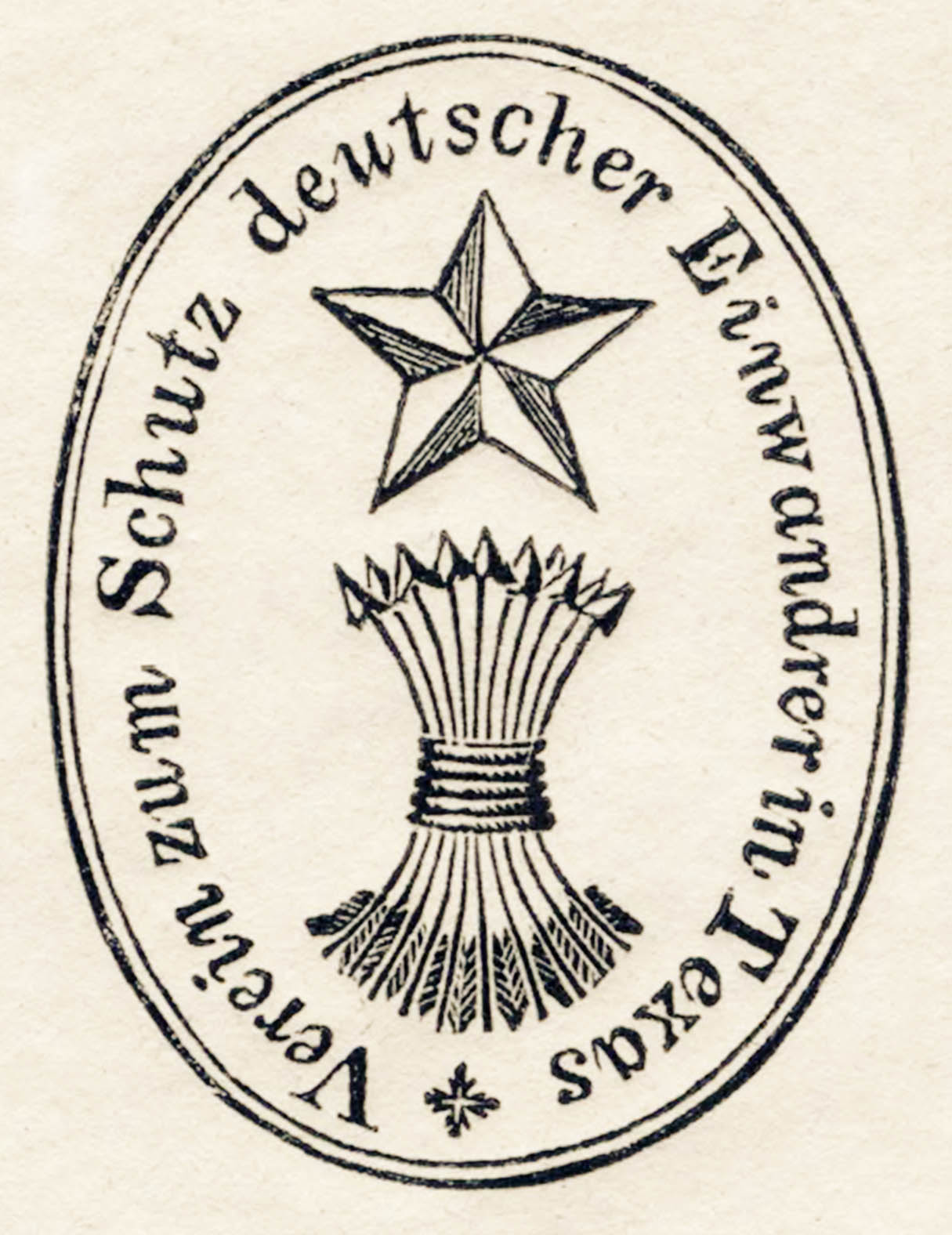
Logo of Verein zum Schutze Deutscher Einwanderer in Texas

The Mainzer Adelsverein at Biebrich am Rhein (Verein zum Schutze Deutscher Einwanderer in Texas; "Society for the Protection of German Immigrants in Texas"), better known as the Mainzer Adelsverein (German pronunciation: [ˈmaɪntsɐ ˈʔaːdl̩sfɐˌʔaɪn]; "Nobility Society of Mainz"), organized on April 20, 1842, was a colonial attempt to establish a new German settlement within the borders of Texas.

== History ==
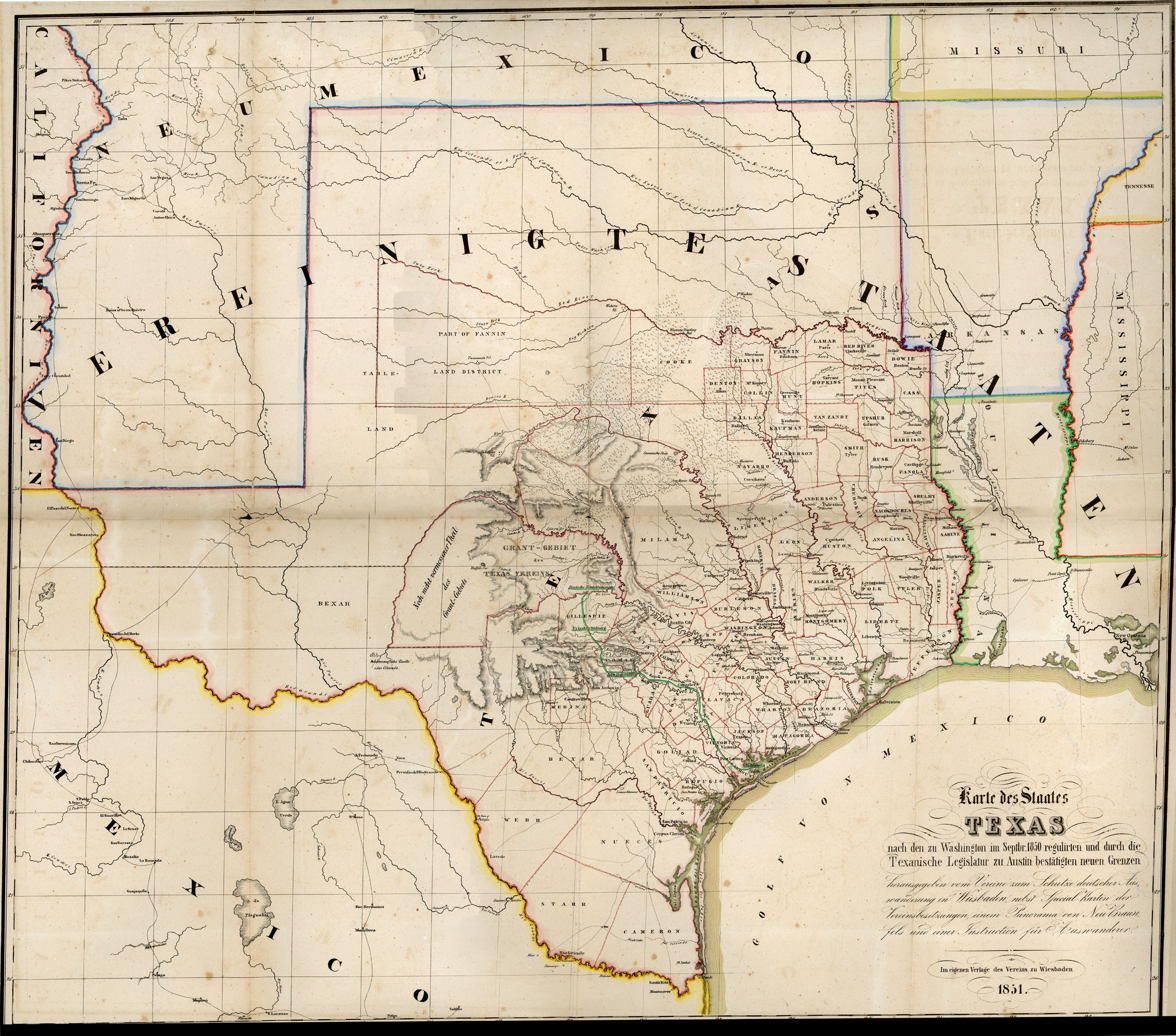
The Adelsverein's Karte des Staates Texas, 1851

The Adelsverein was organized on April 20, 1842, by 21 German noblemen at Biebrich on the Rhine. They gathered at the castle of the German Duke of Nassau, the future Adolphe, Grand Duke of Luxembourg, who was named Protector of the Society. In Germany, the society was referred to as Mainzer Adelsverein after the city of Mainz, where it was officially registered. The society represented a significant effort to establish a new Germany on Texas soil through organized mass emigration. The land for the emigrants was to be purchased by the Adelsverein or secured through land grants from the Republic of Texas.

On January 9, 1843, Count Ludwig Joseph von Boos-Waldeck bought the 4,428-acre Nassau Plantation in Fayette County, Texas, for $0.75 an acre and named it for the Duke of Nassau. Twenty-five slaves were bought to work the property, which initially was considered as the primary base for arriving German immigrants. When Prince Carl of Solms-Braunfels inspected the plantation in 1844, he recommended the Verein divest itself of the property, rather than be associated with slavery. Gustav Dresel, Special Business Agent for the Adelsverein, sold Nassau Plantation on July 28, 1848, to Otto von Roeder. Von Roeder had been the first settler in Shelby, Texas, in 1841, a year before the Adelsverein was founded in Germany, and three years before the Adelsverein sent its first colonists to Texas. Von Roeder had emigrated to Texas from Westphalia in the 1830s and was not affiliated with the Adelsverein's colonization efforts. The community of Shelby had been named for David Shelby, one of the Old Three Hundred under Stephen F. Austin. Shelby became the home of many Adelsverein colonists in 1845, but it was not founded by the organization. Shelby was one of the Latin Settlement communities populated by German intellectuals who had settled in Texas after 1848.

Prince Carl was appointed commissioner general by the Adelsverein in May 1844 to lead its colony in Texas. Each head of household was required to deposit 600 gulden (300 gulden for a single person) with the Adelsverein to cover transportation and housing at the colony and as credit to draw upon until they made their first harvest. The first Adelsverein-sponsored immigrants arrived in Galveston in July 1844. They traveled from Galveston to Indianola in December 1844, then moved inland to land grants acquired by the Adelsverein near Comal Springs. Prince Carl named the first colony New Braunfels in honor of his homeland.

Henry Francis Fisher and Burchard Miller sold their 1842 land grant to the Adelsverein on June 22, 1844. This grant was intended to provide for more settlements in Texas.

After Prince Solms returned to Germany, John O. Meusebach was appointed the second commissioner general of the Adelsverein in April 1845. He founded the first settlement on the outskirts of the land grant, and named it Fredericksburg, in honor of Adelsverein member Prince Frederick of Prussia. The land grant was located in Comanche territory, and to colonize, Meusebach first negotiated a treaty between the German Immigration Company (Adelsverein) and the Penateka Comanche. A separate agreement was made with the Darmstadt Forty, to settle socialist colonies within the land grant.

In 1853, due to a large amount of debt, Adelsverein ended its colonization campaign in Texas.

== Darmstadt Society of Forty ==
Count Castell negotiated with the separate Darmstadt Society of Forty to colonize 200 families on the Fisher–Miller Land Grant territory in Texas. In return, they were to receive $12,000 in money, livestock, equipment, and provisions for a year. After the first year, the colonies were expected to support themselves. The colonies attempted were Castell, Leiningen, Bettina, Schoenburg and Meerholz in Llano County; Darmstädler Farm in Comal County; and Tusculum in Kendall County. Of these, only Castell survives. The colonies failed after the Adelsverein funding expired, and also due to conflict of structure and authorities. Some members moved to other Adelsverein settlements in Texas. Others moved elsewhere, or returned to Germany.

== Texas settlements ==
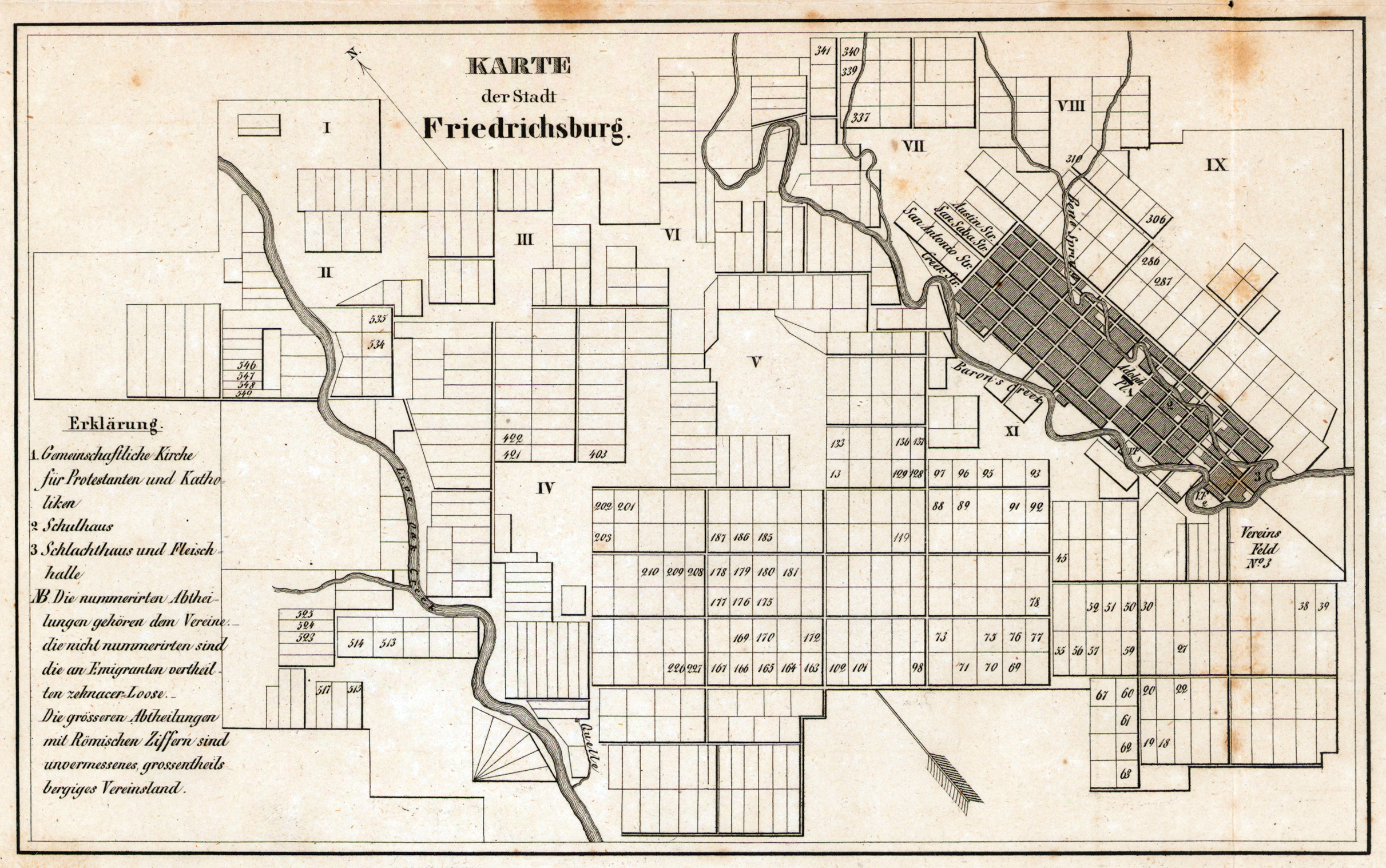
German map of Fredericksburg, 1851

=== Fisher–Miller Land Grant colonies ===
- Bettina, Llano County
- Castell, Llano County
- Leningen, Llano County
- Meerholz, Llano County
- Schoenburg, Llano County

=== Elsewhere ===
- Indianola, Calhoun County
- Fredericksburg, Gillespie County
- Nassau Plantation, Fayette County
- New Braunfels, Comal County
- Sisterdale, Kendall County
- Tusculum, Kendall County
- Gruene, Comal County
- New Ulm, Austin County
- Schertz, Texas

== Members ==
=== Founding members ===
- Adolf, Duke of Nassau
- Bernhard II, Duke of Saxe-Meiningen
- Ernest II, Duke of Saxe-Coburg and Gotha
- Prince Frederick of Prussia
- Friedrich Günther, Prince of Schwarzburg-Rudolstadt
- Carl, 3rd Prince of Leiningen
- Prince Hermann von Wied
- Prince Ferdinand von Solms-Braunfels
- Prince Franz von Colloredo-Mansfeld
- Prince Otto Victor von Schoenberg-Waldenburg
- Prince Carl of Solms-Braunfels (Prince of Solms-Braunfels Rheingrafenstein)
- Prince Alexander von Solms-Braunfels
- Count Christian von Alt-Leiningen-Westerburg
- Count Viktor August of Leiningen-Westerburg-Alt-Leiningen
- Count Carl Frederick Christian of Castell-Castell
- Count Carl von Isenburg-Meerholz
- Count Edmund von Hatzfeld
- Count Carl William von Inn und Knyphausen-Lutelsberg
- Count Armand von Rennesse
- Count Carl von Castell
- Baron Paul Scirnay

=== Leadership ===
- Duke of Nassau – Protector
- Carl, 3rd Prince of Leiningen – President
- Count Carl Frederick Christian of Castell-Castell – Vice President, Executive Secretary-Business Director
- Count Viktor August of Leiningen-Westerburg-Alt-Leiningen – Co-founder
- Count Ludwig Joseph von Boos-Waldeck – Co-Founder
- Baron August von Bibra – General Manager
- Gustav Dresel – Special Business Agent
- Philip Cappes – Special Commissioner
- Prince Carl of Solms-Braunfels – First Commissioner-General
- John O. Meusebach – Second Commissioner-General
- Hermann Spiess – Third Commissioner-General

== See also ==
- American Redoubt
- Free State Project
- German colonial projects before 1871

== Sources ==
- King, Irene Marschall (1967). John O. Meusebach. Austin: University of Texas Press. ISBN 9780292740198. OCLC 17360026.
