= Karl Hartwig Gregor von Meusebach =

German lawyer and literary scholar

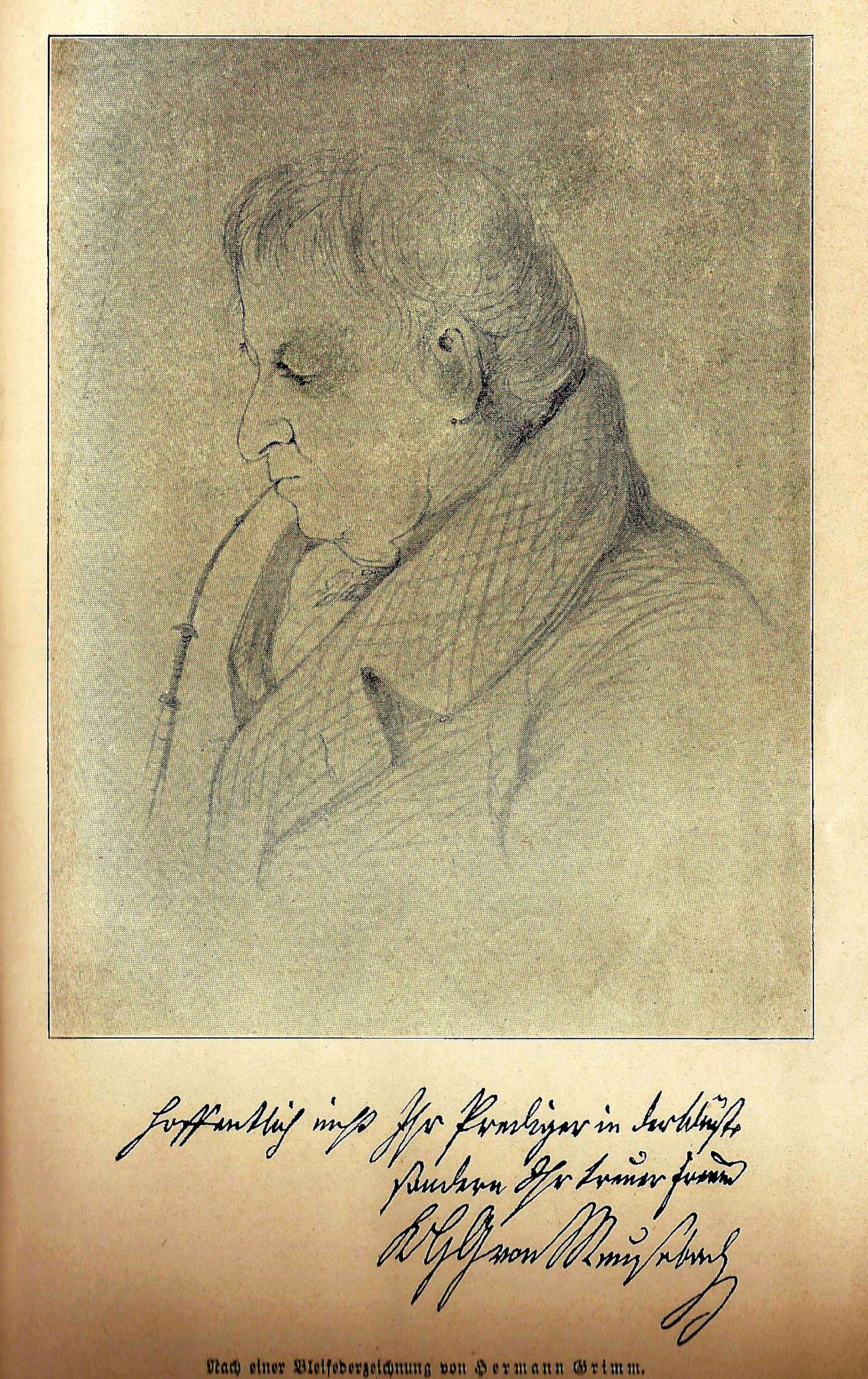
Karl Hartwig Gregor von Meusebach.

Karl Hartwig Gregor von Meusebach (6 June 1781 – 22 August 1847) was a German lawyer and literary scholar born in Voigtstedt, Thuringia. He used the pseudonyms "Alban" and "Markus Hüpfinsholz" in his writings. He was the father to the politician John O. Meusebach (1812-1897).

He studied in Göttingen and Leipzig, and in 1803 was appointed chancery-accessor in Dillenburg. Up until 1842, he was president of the Rheinischen Kassationshofs (Rhineland Cassation).

Meusebach was an expert on German literature, and during his lifetime, he amassed a personal library of 36,000 volumes of 16th–17th-century literature, German church music, folk songs, chapbooks, et al. After his death, his collection was purchased by the Staatsbibliothek zu Berlin (Royal Library in Berlin) for 14700 Taler with support from Friedrich Wilhelm IV.

He was a good friend of the brothers Jacob and Wilhelm Grimm. He was also supportive of young scientists and writers, including the poet August Heinrich Hoffmann von Fallersleben.

== Selected publications ==
- Kornblumen (Cornflowers), 1804.
- Geist aus meinen Schriften. Durch mich selbst herausgezogen, und an das Licht gestellt; 1809.
- Zur Recension der deutschen Grammatik (On the recension of German grammar), irrefuted by Jacob Grimm, 1826.
- Fischart-Studien (Fischart studies), edited by Camillus Wendeler, 1879.
- Briefwechsel des Freiherrn Karl Hartwig Gregor von Meusebach mit Jacob und Wilhelm Grimm (Correspondence of Baron Karl Hartwig Gregor von Meusebach with Jacob and Wilhelm Grimm), edited by Camillus Wendeler, 1880.
