= Columbus, San Antonio and Rio Grande Railroad =

Proposed railroad in Texas, US

Overview
- Headquarters: San Antonio, Texas
- Locale: San Antonio, Texas–Columbus, Texas

Technical
- Track gauge: 4 ft 8 1/2 in (1,435 mm) standard gauge

The Columbus, San Antonio and Rio Grande Railroad (CSA&RG) was a Texas railroad that was never built.

== Formation and charter ==
Railroads were begun in Texas in the 1850s with railheads on the Gulf Coast running inland. As the Buffalo Bayou, Brazos & Colorado Railroad completed its track-laying near Columbus, Texas, investors formed a company to extend tracks into the interior of Texas. William Harbert, Andrew M. Campbell, George W. Smith and Gustav Schleicher intended to extend the railroad from the Colorado River to San Antonio and beyond.

The Columbus, San Antonio and Rio Grande Railroad was chartered by the Texas legislature on February 16, 1858. The charter granted the company the right to build track from Columbus through Gonzales and San Antonio to the Rio Grande. The legislature, in the charter, imposed strict deadlines on the company: two years to begin building track and four years to finish 25 miles. The railroad was unable to meet the standards and the legislature subsequently extended the deadlines on February 8, 1860, granting an additional year to begin building.

== Civil War and disruption ==
According to R. A. Thompson, Engineer of the Texas Railroad Commission, "The blighting effects of the Civil War were felt by the railroads perhaps more than by any other kind of enterprise, and during the financial depression extending particularly from 1862 to 1869, building practically ceased." In fact, the CSA&RG did not lay any tracks before or during the war.

On August 28, 1868, the legislature amended the charter of the Columbus, San Antonio and Rio Grande Railroad to allow it to commence its rail line at Gonzales, or some other point on the as yet unbuilt rail line of the Indianola and Austin Railroad, rather than at Columbus.
