= Hermann Spiess =

Hermann Spiess (c. 1818–1873) was co-founder of the Bettina, Texas commune in 1847. He became Commissioner-General of the Adelsverein after the resignation of John O. Meusebach.

== Early life ==
Hermann was born around 1818 in Offenbach am Main, Grand Duchy of Hesse, to Johann Balthasar Spiess and his wife Luise Werner Spiess. The multi-lingual elder Spiess had been instrumental in founding the Offenbach public school system, and was a musician, pastor and writer.

The family was socially well-connected. Hermann's brother Adolf Spiess was a tutor to Prince Carl of Solms-Braunfels. Adolph was involved with the 1833 Frankfurter Wachensturm attempt to overthrow the government. When events caused Adolph to flee to Burgdorf, Switzerland, he took young Hermann along. Hermann returned in 1835 and enrolled in the Gymnasium in Darmstadt, where he met Ferdinand Ludwig Herff. The same year, he enrolled in the University of Giessen but was expelled for 2½ years because of student political activity opposing the university's administration. He spent the expulsion period enrolled at Polytechnic Institute in Karlsruhe. In 1842, he returned to the University of Giessen and passed his exams. From 1842–1845, Spiess worked for the Woods and Forests Commission in Darmstadt. He then took a two-year leave of absence.

== Texas ==
=== Bettina ===
Spiess, Ferdinand Ludwig Herff and Gustav Schleicher founded the Socialistic Colony and Society, or Die Vierziger (the Society of Forty), which originally had plans to establish socialistic communes in Wisconsin.

Spiess and Herff were approached in Wiesbaden by Adelsverein Vice President and Executive Secretary-Business Director Count Carl Frederick Christian of Castell-Castell, who made a deal with them to colonize two hundred families on the Fisher–Miller Land Grant territory in Texas. In return, they were to receive $12,000 in money, livestock, equipment and provisions for a year. After the first year, the colony was expected to support itself. In 1846, Herff and Spiess emigrated together to the United States via New York City. From there, they traveled by railroad to Wheeling, West Virginia, and by stage coach to New Orleans. They then boarded a ship to Galveston. Spiess went to New Braunfels, and Herff went to Indianola at the end of April 1847 to await the arrival of the other colony members. John O. Meusebach and Spiess chose the location for Bettina in 1847 on the banks of the Llano River. The commune was named in honor of Bettina von Arnim, an early feminist activist and a personal friend of the Meusebach family. The majority of the Bettina settlers arrived in August 1847. Jacob Kuechler was one of the notables at the commune. Bettina failed after the Adelsverein funding expired, and due to conflict of structure and authorities. Some members moved to other Adelsverein settlements in Texas. Others moved elsewhere, or returned to Germany.

=== Commissioner-General of Adelsverein ===
In 1846, John O. Meusebach designated Dr. Friedrich A. Schubbert the director of the colony at Fredericksburg, recommended by Henry Francis Fisher. Unknown to Meusebach at the time, Schubbert's real name was Friedrich Armand Strubberg. He changed his name after fleeing two duels, one in Germany and one in New York City. On arrival in Texas in 1844, he used the alias Dr. Friedrich A. Schubbert. He and Henry Francis Fisher worked in tandem to entice immigrants away from the Verein settlements to the St. Gabriel colony he had established in Milam County.

In Fredericksburg, Schubbert instigated a failed coup d'état against Meusebach. On July 12, 1847, Meusebach sent Schubbert a letter of dismissal from his position as director of Fredericksburg, appointing Jean Jacques von Coll as his successor.

After a duel with Schubbert (Strubberg) trying to oust him from the Nassau Plantation, two men were shot. The State of Texas tried Spiess, and he was acquitted on September 27, 1848, on grounds of self-defense. With the finances of the Adelsverein on the verge of collapse, the administration of Fredericksburg and Indianola was ended.

Spiess continued the Verein activities of New Braunfels. In 1848, Spiess, Ludwig Bene and Louis Cachand Ervendberg established the Western Texas Orphan Asylum. In 1850, Spiess joined others to construct a toll bridge across the river in New Braunfels.

== Personal life and death ==
In 1851 Spiess married to Lena Spiess. (ca. 1836–1914) The couple had ten children. Spiess owned property at Waco Springs, four miles north of New Braunfels, where he built a sawmill and a shingle mill. In 1867, the Spiess family moved to Warrensburg, Missouri where Hermann Spiess spent his final years. He died in Warrensburg on July 16, 1884, and is buried there. Lena Spiess died in Warrensburg on January 3, 1914, and was buried locally.
