= Count Ludwig Joseph von Boos-Waldeck =

German noble

Count Ludwig Joseph von Boos-Waldeck (26 November 1798 – 1 October 1880) was a German noble who promoted the settling of Texas by Germans.

Boos-Waldeck was born in Koblenz as the son of Count Clemens von Boos zu Waldeck (1773-1842) and Baroness Johanna von Bibra. He descended from a line of Rhenish knights and nobles dating back to the 13th century. Boos-Waldeck married about 1827 Baroness Henriette von Wessenberg-Ampringen (1807-1856), the daughter of Johann Freiherr von Wessenberg-Ampringen (1773-1858). He was the uncle of the composer Count Victor von Boos zu Waldeck (1840-1916).

In April 1842 Boos-Waldeck and a few other nobles met at Biebrich on the Rhine, near Mainz, to organize a society, which they called the Adelsverein, to promote German immigration to Texas. In 1843 Boos-Waldeck bought and developed the Nassau Plantation near Round Top, Texas on behalf of the Adelsverein. In addition to his native German, he spoke Spanish and English when Texas came under Mexican and U.S. rule. He died in Aschaffenburg, Kingdom of Bavaria.

== Sources ==
Handbook of Texas Online
