= Adolf Spiess =

German gymnast and educator (1810–1858)

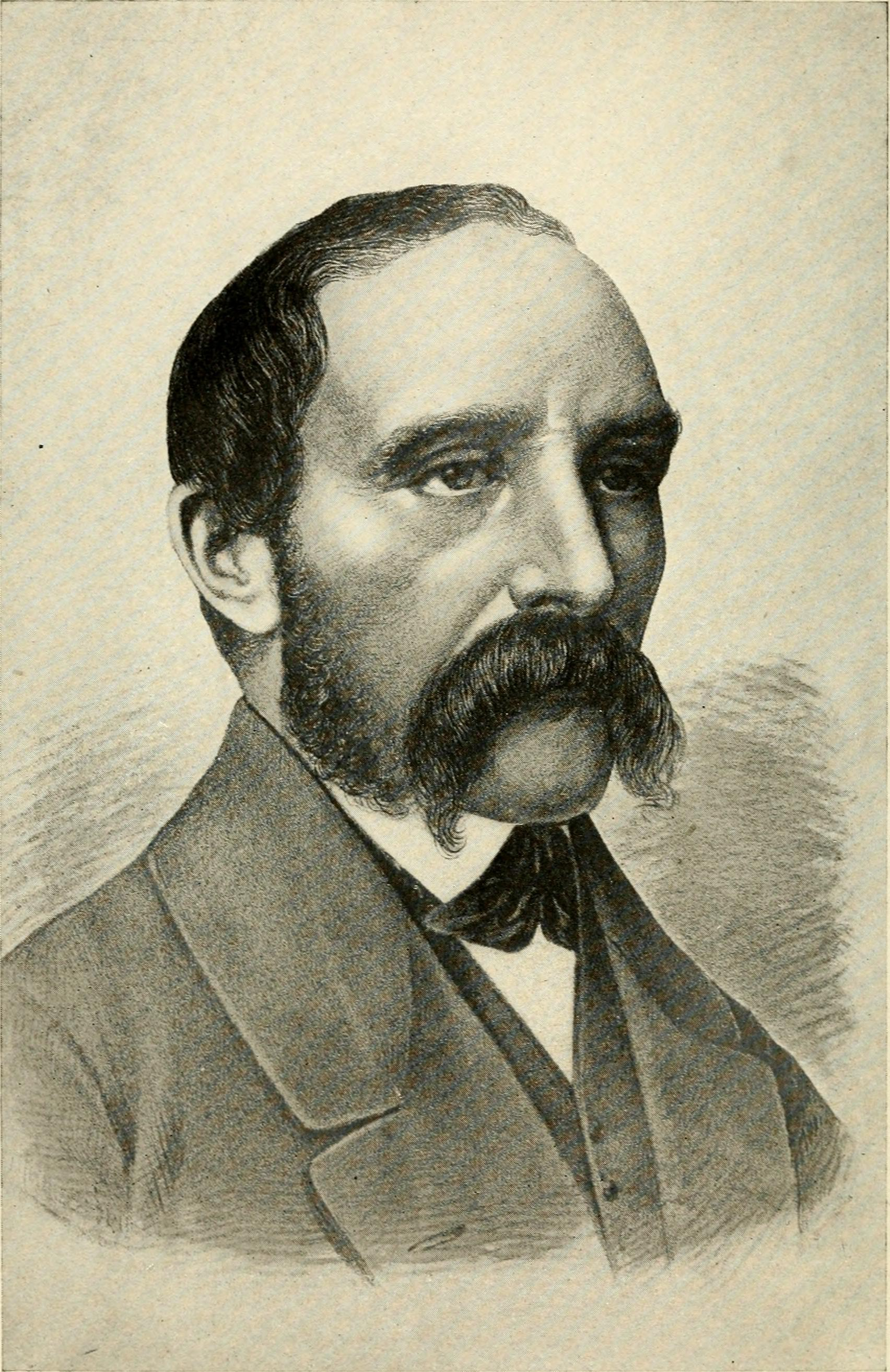
- Illustration from A Guide to the History of Physical Education, by Fred Eugene Leonard. Lea & Febiger, 1923 (artist uncredited)
- Born: 3 February 1810; Lauterbach, Grand Duchy of Hesse, Confederation of the Rhine
- Died: 9 May 1858 (aged 48); Darmstadt, Grand Duchy of Hesse, German Confederation

Academic background
- Education: University of Giessen (Theology); Martin Luther University of Halle-Wittenberg (Theology)

Academic work
- Discipline: Gymnastics; Intramural sports

Karl Adolf Spieß (3 February 1810 – 9 May 1858) was a German gymnast and educator who contributed to the development of school gymnastics for children of both sexes in Switzerland and Germany.

== Biography ==
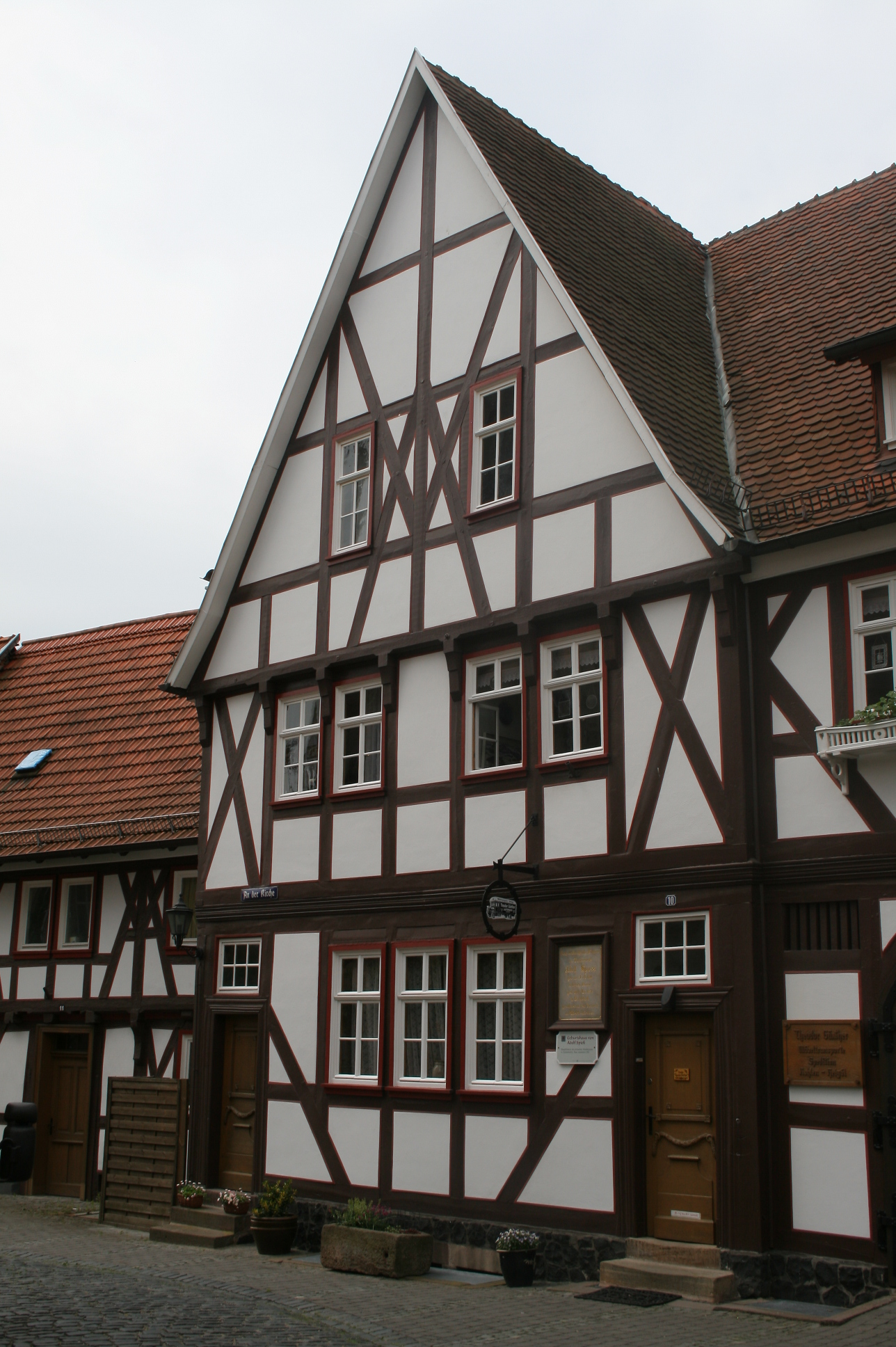
Adolf Spiess's birthplace in Lauterbach

=== Father ===
Spiess's father, Johann Balthasar Spiess (1782–1841) and himself the son of a Thuringian farmer and master smith, had first prepared himself for a position as teacher in the elementary schools, but after some years of professional experience at Frankfurt am Main decided upon further study, and so completed a course in theology at the University of Giessen, and immediately after passing his examination, in 1807, became teacher and sub-rector at the Latin school in Lauterbach. There he brought his bride Luise Werner, of Saarbrücken, who he had first met in Frankfurt. Adolf Spiess, born in Lauterbach, Hesse, was the oldest of their five children. His younger brother Hermann Spiess would become a co-founder of the Bettina, Texas commune in 1847.

In 1811 the father accepted a pastoral position in the Evangelical Lutheran Church at Offenbach, across the Main from Frankfurt, and in addition to his clerical duties opened a private school which prepared for the upper classes of the gymnasium (a higher classical school) or for a mercantile career. Ten years before this he had observed the methods in use at Schnepfenthal, and made the acquaintance of GutsMuths and other teachers there, renewed by frequent later visits. It was therefore natural that one feature of the daily program should be gymnastics, as described and practised by GutsMuths — walking the balance beam, jumping, running, climbing, throwing, skating, swimming, etc., and games of all sorts. Every week throughout the year there were also excursions with teachers, and dancing lessons were given in the winter months.

=== Education ===
Adolf Spiess entered his father's school at the age of six or less. A few years later, in 1819, Fritz Hessemer, just back from the University of Giessen, made the pupils acquainted with the new Jahn gymnastics, and parallel bars and a horizontal bar were now added to the equipment. In 1824 some of the boys organized a little society for the purpose of practising gymnastics regularly outside of school hours. They met in the private garden exercise area (German: Turnplatz) of Councillor (German: Hofrath) A. André, using Jahn's Deutsche Turnkunst as a guide. They soon met other turners in Hanau, a few miles to the east, with whom joint excursions on foot to the Taunus Range were made in 1826 and 1827.

In the spring or summer of 1828, Spiess went to the University of Giessen to pursue the study of theology. He at once joined the Burschenschaft, which had been organized ten years previously and now concealed itself under the name Waffenverbindung (weaponry association). He assiduously practiced fencing, the favorite student exercise, and before the end of the year became proficient. He went on many mountain and castle excursions with friends, and displayed skill in all forms of physical activity — riding, swimming, skating, dancing, and gymnastics. He also pursued music and drawing. He met Jahn during an excursion to the Harz Mountains.

In 1829, Spiess continued his theological studies at the University of Halle. In Halle there were opportunities for practice on the horizontal bar, the parallel bars, and the horse, and fencing, too, but the greatest interest was in certain outdoor games — the students, often a hundred or more, gathered twice a week in Passendorf, singing and playing together until nightfall. In late December, Spiess went to Berlin for several months where he frequented Eiselen's private gym, and learned many new exercises from Philipp Feddern, Eiselen's assistant.

In the spring of 1830, Spiess was back in Giessen, and active in the life of its Burschenschaft. He began to give instruction in gymnastics, first to a dozen boys on a garden Turnplatz, and later to nearly 150 in one of the city parks. He modified the traditional method by gathering the entire number into one band at the commencement of each period for various simple exercises performed in rhythm as they stood or marched, or for running and jumping under the leadership of a single teacher.

The Hessian authorities were on the lookout for agitation looking toward a united Germany, and had already given notice to the University that no student who was affiliated with forbidden organizations, like the Burschenschaft, would be admitted to the regular examinations. The July revolution in France, however, exerted a stimulating influence. Early in 1831 the local association allied itself with the general German Burschenschaft, and members were openly displaying signs of their sympathy with the radical element. Under such circumstances any revival of the old Turnen (Jahn-style gymnastics) was certain to be viewed with apprehension. In the spring of 1831 the former prohibition was renewed, and there could be no more exercising by groups in public. After some months of private study at Sprendlingen, his father's new parish, Spiess returned to Giessen and successfully passed his examinations in theology, 2 April 1832.

=== Burgdorf, Switzerland ===
After graduation, Spiess became private tutor in the family of the Hessian Count Solms-Rödelheim, at Assenheim. Around this time, on a visit to his family in Sprendlingen, one evening a friendly magistrate informed his father that if Adolf was found in the house on the following morning he would be subject to arrest. Spiess therefore left at once, and reached Assenheim in safety.

In 1833, his father read a newspaper notice that the city of Burgdorf, Switzerland, was in search of someone who could take charge of physical training in its elementary school. The clergyman, recognizing that a sojourn in a neutral country was the only safe course for his son, in view of existing political conditions, at once wrote to propose Adolf for the place. Word came in August that Adolf had been appointed teacher of gymnastics, singing, writing, and drawing. (In 1835, geography and history was substituted for writing and drawing.) On 5 October he left home with his youngest brother, Hermann, and traveling by way of Basel reached Burgdorf on the 21st, ready to begin work in the state which was to be his home for the next fifteen (1833–1848).

The city authorities had erected a new, attractive, and roomy building for the school, and now placed at its head Friedrich Fröbel, already widely known for his book The Education of Man (1826). Also present were Heinrich Langethal (1792–1879) and Wilhelm Middendorf (1793–1853) who had been associated with Fröbel for fourteen years in his school in the Thuringian village of Keilhau, and after the few years in Burgdorf were again to be his helpers when the first kindergarten was opened at Blankenburg, another Thuringian town. All three had been members of Lützow's Free Corps during the War of Liberation, and through residence in Berlin had come under the influence of Jahn and his work at the Hasenheide Turnplatz.

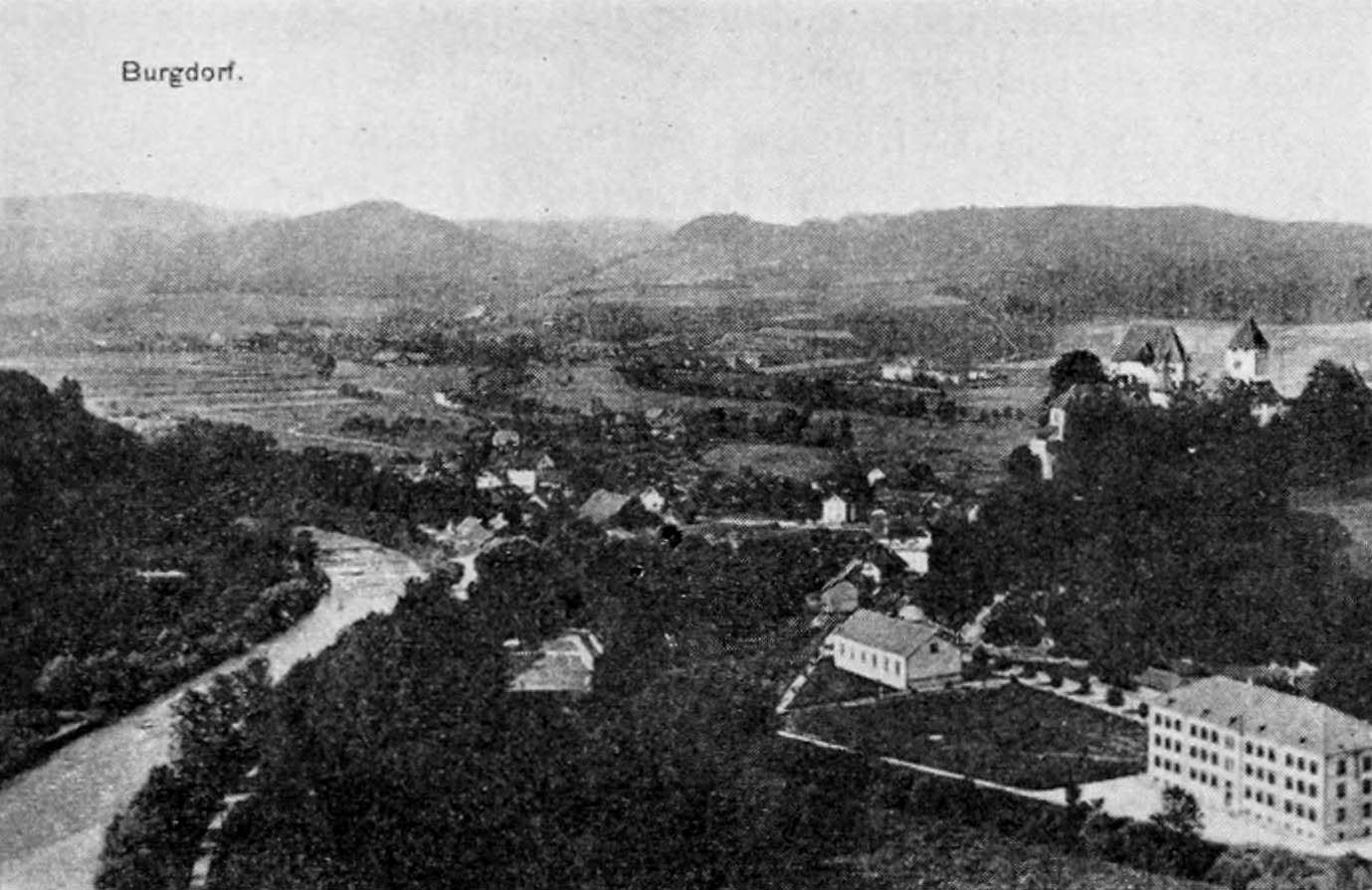
Original Spiess Turnplatz at Burgdorf in the grove between the river Emme (left) and the castle, Schloss Bergdorf (on a hill to the far right).

Spiess found these colleagues ready to cooperate with him at every step, and all worked together in perfect harmony to give the broadest possible training to the children under their care. The open-air gymnasium, originally laid out after the Jahn plan in 1824, and beautifully situated in a grove near the left bank of the Emme, overlooked to the east by wooded sandstone cliffs beyond the stream and on the west by an ancient castle, was now doubled in size and entirely refitted in accordance with the wishes of the new teacher. In the castle itself, where Pestalozzi had conducted his school for five years (1799–1804) and written How Gertrude Teaches Her Children (1801), a hall was equipped for winter use.

In the spring of 1834 the boys of the school, including even the youngest, began to receive systematic instruction in gymnastics for two successive hours on three afternoons of each week, and before long the interest of the girls, also, was awakened and special classes were formed and suitable exercises devised to meet their needs. There were frequent excursions on foot into the surrounding country. Once a year, in the autumn, an exhibition (German: Turnfest) was held. The new discipline, which reached pupils of both sexes and all ages, was regarded as an essential part of their school training.

It was not long before the attention of the cantonal school authorities was attracted to the Burgdorf experiment, and as a result Spiess received in 1835 the added appointment of teacher of gymnastics in the normal school (German: Landschullehrer-Seminar) ten miles away at Münchenbuchsee where he had about 100 pupils and a model school of 80 children. Spiess took on similar tasks at various other schools in the neighborhood, among them a school for girls in Kirchberg. For his own pleasure and further training, he joined a small gymnastic society of men (German: Männerturnverein) in Burgdorf, visited the Turners in Bern and Hofwyl, and attended the annual Swiss Turnfeste held in Bern (1839), Basel (1841), and Zurich (1842).

Spiess found that the material and methods of Jahn's Deutsche Turnkunst were not sufficient for his needs. Little by little he began therefore to develop and test new groups of exercises, first of all what he called "Free Exercises," or those which require either no apparatus at all, or only such as can be carried in the hands. They were intended to secure ready control and graceful carriage of the body under ordinary conditions, while the pupil was standing or walking on the usual supporting surface, and differed in this particular from the forms commonly practised on the old Turnplatz.

To instruct large numbers of pupils at once in these free exercises, he developed marching exercises (German: Ordnungsübungen), by means of which the entire class moved as one individual, and in this way discipline and order were improved, since each pupil learned to handle himself as part of the whole, and any desired arrangement of the units could be promptly secured. The next step was a review of all the gymnastic material in the effort to devise a more satisfactory classification than the one adopted in the books of GutsMuths, Jahn's Deutsche Turnkunst, and Eiselen's Turntafeln (1837). The result of this study was Spiess's publication in 1840 of the first part (on free exercise) of his System of Gymnastics (German: Lehre der Turnkunst), followed by a second part (on hanging exercises) in 1842, and a third part (on supporting exercises, including balancing and vaulting — German: Stemmübungen) in 1843.

=== Prussian initiative ===
In the summer of 1842 Spiess returned to Germany, drawn by the signs of approaching gymnastic revival in Prussia and the desire to discuss his own views with other men of like interests. A Prussian cabinet order of 6 June 1842, had stated physical training was "formally recognized as a necessary and indispensable part of male education." Spiess found Hans Ferdinand Massmann, at Munich, too firmly wedded to Turnen of his student days to receive with any sympathy the proposed innovations, but Jahn, whose guest he was for two days in Freyburg, and Eiselen, whom he saw at a watering-place near Berlin, were more cordial in their attitude.

On 10 August, Spiess visited Prussian minister Eichhorn, who was charged with putting the cabinet order into effect. On the request of Eichhorn, once back in Burgdorf, Spiess followed up the visit on 18 October with a formal statement of his ideas regarding the essential features of a state system of physical training for the schools, "Thoughts on the method to be followed in making gymnastics an integral element in popular education." The steps therein advocated were taken, in part at least, by almost every German state, and the author, Adolf Spiess, was dubbed "founder of school gymnastics in Germany and of gymnastics for girls in particular."

=== Basel, Switzerland ===
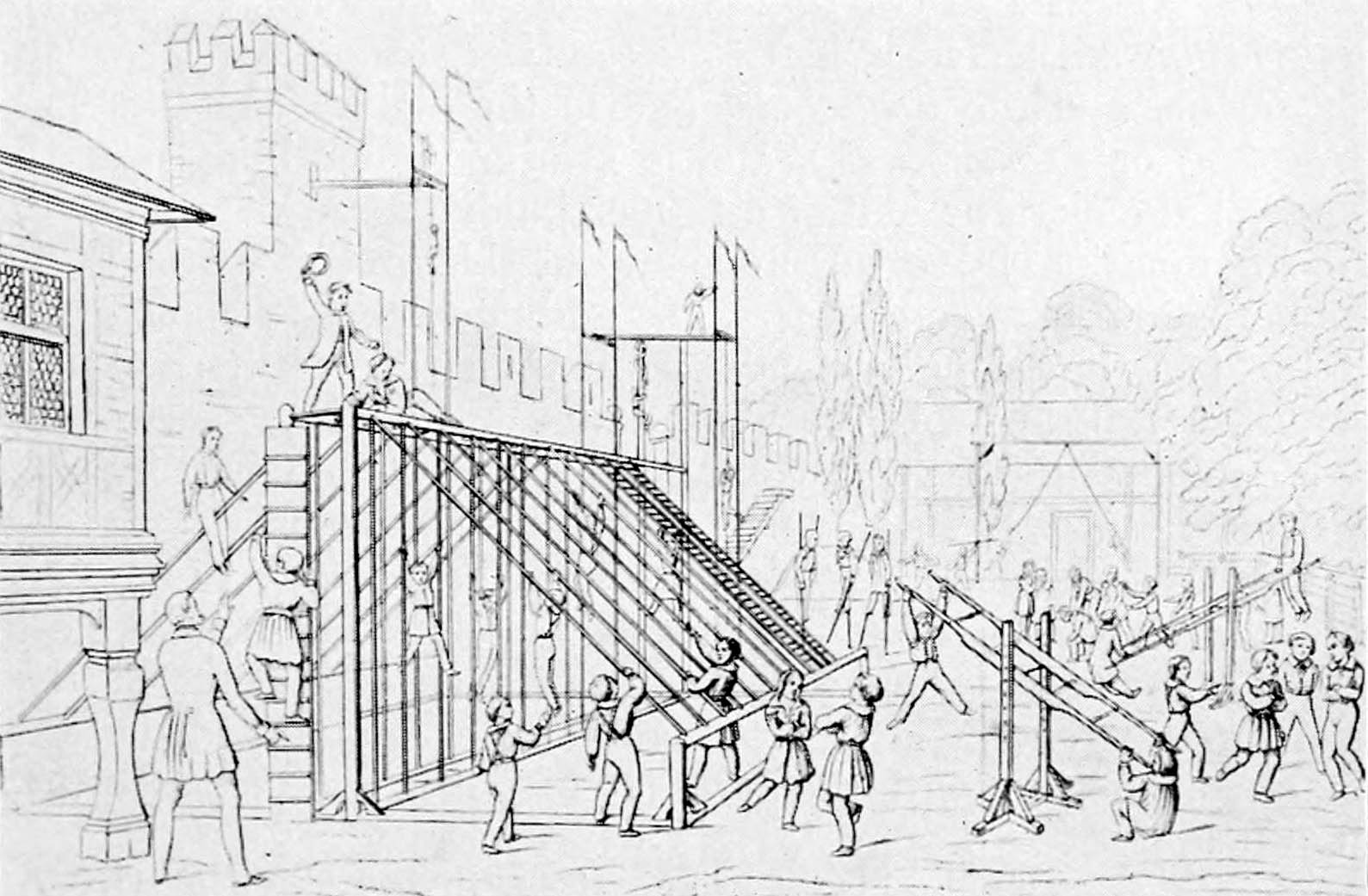
The Basel Turnplatz from a plate in Adolf Spiess's book Turnbuch für Schulen of 1847

Two years earlier, Spiess had married a former pupil, Marie Buri, and the need of finding a larger and more remunerative field of usefulness no doubt had much to do with the journey to Berlin; but the summons of Massmann to the Prussian capital in 1843 put an end to all hopes in that direction. With further attempts, he received a call from Basel to the position of teacher of gymnastics and history in two higher schools for boys — the Gymnasium and the Realschule — and at the orphan asylum. He entered upon these duties in May 1844. The following March he was relieved of the work in history in order that he might have time for instruction in gymnastics at the public girls' school (German: Töchterschule), and preparations were also made for progressive improvement in physical training at all the city schools.

Free at last to devote all his thought to the one subject, he finished in 1846 the fourth and final part of his System of Gymnastics, and the next year was able to publish the first volume of a practical manual for teachers (Turnbuch für Schulen), containing graded series of exercises suitable for boys and girls between the ages of six and ten. The second volume, covering the ages from ten to sixteen, was completed in 1851, after he had left Basel and returned to Germany.

=== Darmstadt, Germany ===
In May 1848 Spiess accepted an offer from Minister von Gagern of Hesse, and moved to Darmstadt, the capital of the Grand Duchy, to undertake the task of introducing gymnastics into the schools of that state, beginning with the higher schools and the common schools of such communities as were prepared to take the step at once. He was also to train the requisite teaching force, and afterwards superintend their work. The salary of the new “Oberstudien Assessor” was fixed at 2000 gulden. Lessons were immediately begun with classes in two secondary schools for boys (the Gymnasium and the Realschule) and in the higher school for girls (Mädchen- or Töchterschule). In a large garden lying near the center of the city the hall of a former public house was converted into a gymnasium by setting up along one side rows of vertical poles and horizontal bars and ladders, and adding to these a giant stride, parallel bars, bucks, jump stands and jumping ropes, stilts, and poles for use in vaulting.

A four weeks' normal course was given in 1849 to about 30 teachers in elementary and higher schools, most of them from Darmstadt, but one from Dresden and ten from Mainz, Offenbach, Worms, and other Hessian towns. Instruction was chiefly by means of model classes, conducted by Spiess in their presence, and after observing these the teachers themselves were given an opportunity to practice the same exercises. In response to an invitation, he took charge of a similar course in Oldenburg, capital of a Grand Duchy of the same name, in 1851. He also visited many places in Hesse in the interest of physical training, and teachers from all parts of the state came to Darmstadt from time to time during the next few years to become familiar with his method. A list of foreign visitors during the period 1852–1854 listed educators from Sweden (1), Belgium (1), Switzerland (3), Austria (4), Prussia (6), Saxony (2), Württemberg (2), Baden (5), Oldenburg (4), Frankfurt am Main (8), and smaller German states.

In 1852, a new indoor gym (German: Turnhaus) was opened for use classes of boys and girls from various schools. It contained a hall one hundred by sixty feet which could be changed into two rooms by means of a movable partition. It was surrounded by a double Turnplatz and was the first building of the kind in Germany. Public exhibitions the next year and again in 1855 acquainted parents, teachers, the grand ducal family, and the state and city authorities with the nature of his work.

In 1855, failing health compelled Spiess to interrupt his hitherto unceasing activity. Tuberculosis had developed in a lung wounded by a sword thrust during his student days as a second to a duel. Attempts to stop its progress by residence in the Taunus and for two years at Vevey, on Lake Geneva, proved unavailing. He returned to Darmstadt, visiting the Turnhaus there for the last time in the fall of 1857, and died the following year.

== Works ==
- Die Lehre der Turnkunst (System of Gymnastics). Basel, Schweighauser'sche Buchhandlung. In four volumes:
  1. “Das Turnen in den Freiübungen für beide Geschlechter” (Free exercises for both sexes, 1840)
  2. “Das Turnen in den Hangübungen für beide Geschlechter” (Hanging exercises for both sexes; 1842; 2nd ed., 1871)
  3. “Das Turnen in den Stemmübungen für beide Geschlechter, mit einem Anhang der Liegeübungen” (Supporting exercises for both sexes with an appendix on exercise while lying on the ground; 1843; 2nd ed., 1874)
  4. “Das Turnen in den Gemeinübungen, in einer Lehre von den Ordnungsverhältnissen bei den Gliederungen einer Mehrzahl fur beide Geschlechter” (Group exercise for both sexes, with instructions for the orderly coordination of large numbers; 1846; 2nd ed., Basel: Benno Schwabe, 1885)
- Turnbuch für Schulen als Anleitung fiir den Turnunterricht durch die Lehrer der Schulen (School exercise book for the direction of exercise instruction by teachers). Basel, Schweighauser'sche Buchhandlung. In two volumes:
  1. “Die Uebungen für die Altersstufe vom sechsten bis zehnten Jahre bei Knaben und Mädchen” (Exercises for boys and girls aged 6 to 10; 1847; 2nd enlarged and improved ed. by J. C. Lion, 1880)
  2. “Die Uebungen für die Altersstufe vom zehnten bis sechszehnten Jahre bei Knaben und Mädchen” (Exercises for boys and girls aged 10 to 16; 1851; 2nd ed. as above, Basel: Benno Schwabe, 1889)
