= Nassau Plantation (Texas) =

Plantation in Fayette County, Texas

Coordinates: 30°05′57″N 96°37′08″W

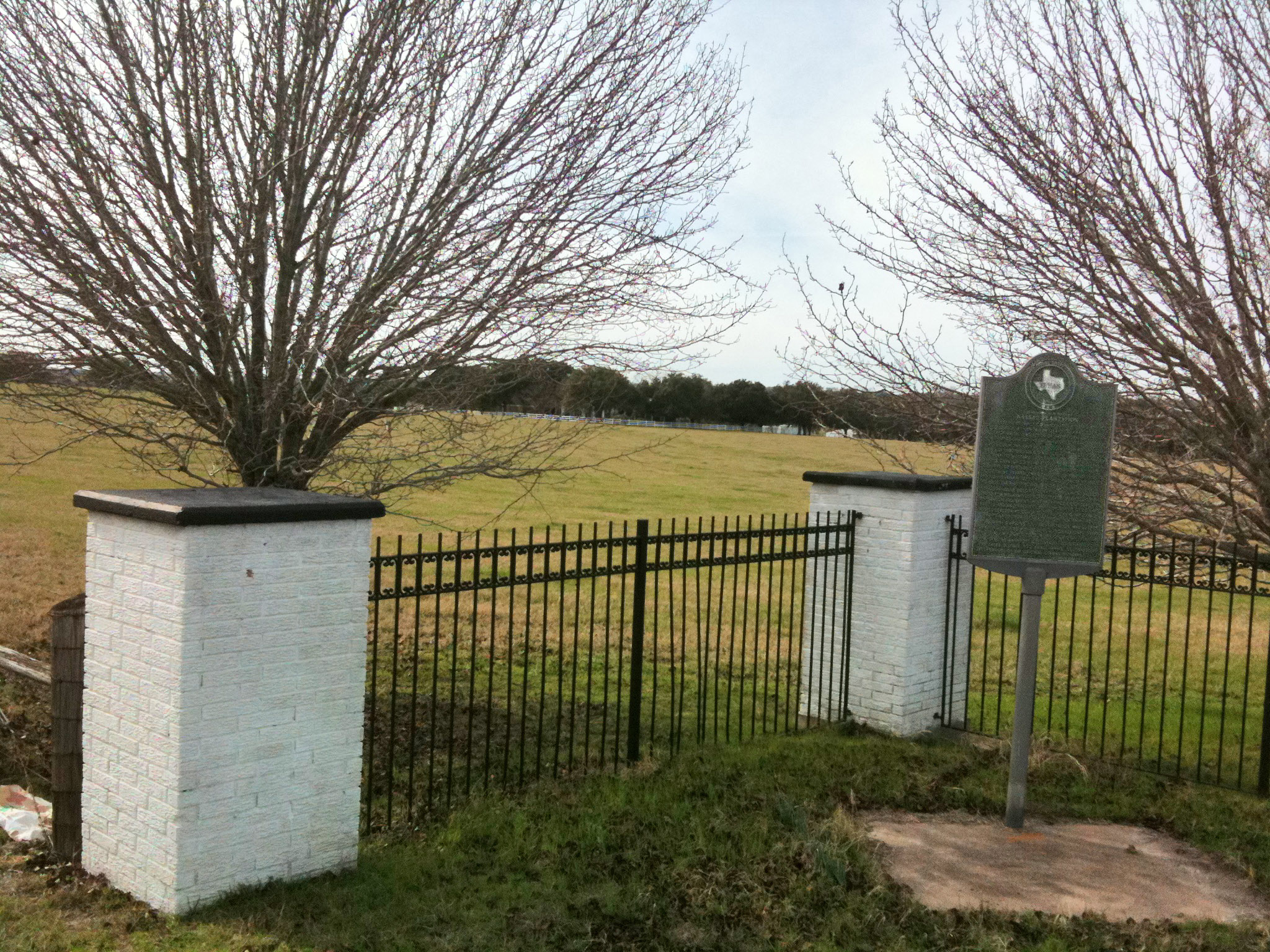
View of the historical marker on the site of the plantation

Location of Nassau Plantation, Texas

Nassau Plantation was a 4,428 acres (17.92 km^{2}; 6.919 sq mi) endeavor purchased by the Adelsverein on January 9, 1843, in Fayette County, Texas, near what is now Round Top. A Texas State Historical Marker was installed in 1968, Marker 3550.

== Original purchase ==
The league of land was purchased near from what is now Round Top, from Robert Mills by Adelsverein officers Count Ludwig Joseph von Boos-Waldeck and Count Viktor August of Leiningen-Westerburg-Alt-Leiningen, at a cost of seventy-five cents an acre. It was named for the Duke of Nassau, in whose castle the Adelsverein was established. The acreage was developed as a full working plantation using slave labor bought by Count Boos-Waldeck in New Orleans, Galveston, and Houston. When Prince Solms inspected the plantation in 1844, he recommended the Verein divest itself of the property, rather than be associated with slavery.

Initially, the plantation had been considered as the primary base for arriving German immigrants, but the immigrants instead went to colonies established by Prince Carl of Solms-Braunfels and John O. Meusebach. Nassau Plantation became a luxurious noblemen's retreat for representatives of the Adelsverein. Prince Solms enjoyed horse racing and extravagant entertaining on the property. John O. Meusebach resided at Nassau from April to July 1846 to recover his health.

One of the early managers of Nassau appointed by Prince Solms was Friedrich W. von Wrede, Sr. from Oberhausen, Germany. On October 24, 1845, Wrede and New Braunfels botanist Oscar von Claren were scalped and killed by a tribe of Comanche Indians while camping about ten miles from Austin.

== Sale ==
The plantation was mismanaged and operated at a loss. Gustav Dresel, Special Business Agent for the Adelsverein, sold Nassau plantation and its twenty-five slaves on July 28, 1848, to Otto von Roeder. Von Roeder, in turn, sold off 800 acres (3.2 km^{2}) of undeveloped land and the manor house to fellow Prussian nobleman, Baron Peter Carl Johann von Rosenberg, who immigrated to Texas in 1849 with his family from their estate, Eckitten, near Memel in East Prussia.

In 1853, Bexar County district court ordered the Fayette County sheriff to sell the league, to satisfy creditors of the Adelsverein. The sheriff sold the property to James A. Chandler on May 3, 1853. Chandler filed suit for legal title. In June 1868, Chandler recovered judgment.
