= Hans Ferdinand Massmann =

Prussian gymnast and philologist (1797–1874)

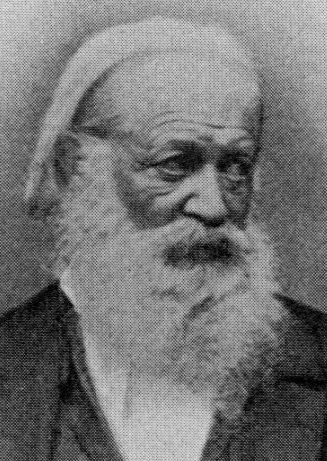
Hans Ferdinand Massmann.

Hans Ferdinand Massmann (German: Maßmann; 15 August 1797 – 3 August 1874) was a German philologist, known for his studies in Old German language and literature, and for his work introducing gymnastics into schools in Prussia.

== Biography ==
Massmann was born in Berlin, Margraviate of Brandenburg, where he also studied. He served in the War of Liberation, was a member of the Burschenschaft at the University of Jena, and was present at the Wartburg festival of 1817, where he participated in the book burning. In Berlin, he had been a friend and a pupil of Friedrich Ludwig Jahn. His radical ideas and "demagogue" sympathies brought him into difficulties with the authorities.

In 1826, he became the teacher in charge of gymnastics at the Royal Gymnastic Institute in Munich. Initially his duties included military cadets. Later his duties were extended to a public outdoor exercise facility (German: Turnanstalt) which was to serve all the schools in the city. Later he was also chosen professor of Old German Literature at the Ludwig-Maximilians-Universität München.

In 1841, he went to Berlin to confer with Minister Eichhorn regarding the revival of physical training in Prussia. Eichhorn later spoke with Adolf Spiess, a citizen of Hesse who had been directing such programs in Burgdorf, Switzerland. In 1842, Massmann was chosen to implement the plans developed, a position which he resigned in 1851. During this time, he accepted the chair of Germanic philology at the Friedrich Wilhelm University of Berlin.

He died in Muskau in Lusatia.

== Works ==
Massmann's writings include editions of Deutsche Gedichte des 12 Jahrhunderts (1837–42); Gottfried's Tristan and Iseult (1843); Kaiserchronik (1849–53); of the biblical translations of the Gothic bishop Ulfilas (1855–56) and of Tacitus's Germania (1847). He was also the author of Geschichte des mittelalterlichen Schachspiels (1839) and Litteratur der Totentänze (1840).
