= Bettina, Texas =

Former community in Texas, U.S.

Coordinates: 30°42′4″N 98°57′23.7″W

Bettina is a vanished community founded in 1847 by German immigrants as part of the Adelsverein colonization of the Fisher–Miller Land Grant in the U.S. state of Texas. It was located on the banks of the Llano River in Llano County, and no trace of the settlement remains today. The community was named after German artist and social activist Bettina von Arnim and was one of five attempted by the Darmstadt Forty. It was also known as the Darmstaedter Kolonie. The community was sponsored by the Adelsverein and founded on idealistic philosophies of European freethinkers of the day. It is notable for the community's camaraderie and mutually respectful relations with local indigenous tribes. Lack of a formal community framework caused Bettina to fail within a year of its founding.

== History ==
The colony had its beginnings in 1846 in Darmstadt, Giessen, and Heidelberg, where Prince Carl of Solms-Braunfels delivered speeches on behalf of the Adelsverein, promoting Texas as a utopian frontier for university graduates. The Darmstadt Forty was a freethinker organization founded by Hermann Spiess, Ferdinand Ludwig Herff, and Gustav Schleicher, and based on ideals of Étienne Cabet and Charles Fourier. The Darmstadt Forty group set sail with dogs, goods, supplies, and an array of musical instruments aboard the St. Pauli from Hamburg in April 1847, arriving in Galveston on July 17. From Galveston, they sailed to Indianola, where Adelsverein Commissioner-General John O. Meusebach had arranged for numerous wagons to haul the group and its freight inland. They were paid $10,000 in gold to help finance the first year of their settlement. During the four weeks needed for them to travel to New Braunfels, the trek took on the ambiance of a collegiate party, with beer and singing and youthful high-spiritedness filling the journey.

Spiess and Meusebach scouted the area of the Llano River and chose the location for Bettina. Member Louis Reinhardt described the Llano River as so pure and crystal clear, they named it the Silvery Llano. Upon reaching the site of Bettina, the group unloaded their musical instruments and began to sing their favorite songs. An adobe house was constructed with an outer siding of 10,000 shingles carved from a single pecan tree. The house was topped with a weather vane made by August Strauss.

As made possible in part by the Meusebach–Comanche Treaty, the group's interactions with local indigenous tribes were cordial. Reinhardt listed seven tribes among the colony's visitors: Comanche, Lipan Apache, Waco, Delaware, Kickapoo, Choctaw, and Shawnee. The colonists and the tribes shared food and goods and tried to learn each other's languages. Reinhardt claimed that the indigenous people usually gave back three times more than the colonists gave them.

The downfall of the colony was brought about by its own ideals of having a community not regulated by authority figures. Conflicts arose between individuals over who would shoulder the bulk of the workload. Only one crop was ever harvested, which was 200 bushels of corn. After the Adelsverein's funding ran out, members of the group gradually drifted elsewhere.
