= Fisher–Miller Land Grant =

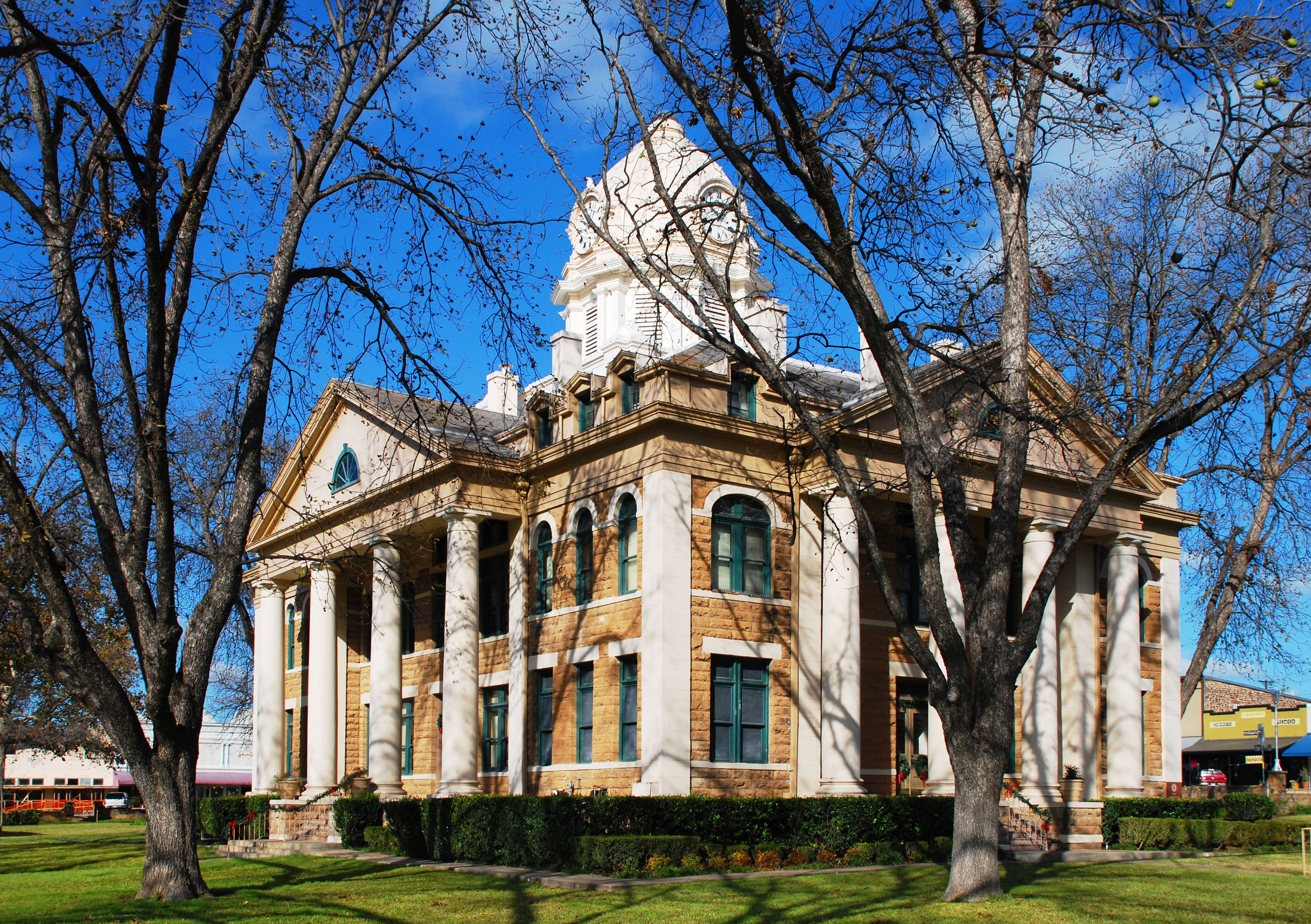
The Mason County Courthouse, built on land included in the Fisher–Miller Land Grant.

The Fisher–Miller Land Grant was part of an early colonization effort of the Republic of Texas. Its 3,878,000 acres covered 5,000 square miles (13,000 km^{2}) between the Llano River and Colorado River. Originally granted to Henry Francis Fisher and Burchard Miller, the grant was sold to the German colonization company of Adelsverein. Very few colonizations resulted from the land grant, as most settlers preferred Fredericksburg and New Braunfels, which lay outside the land grant boundaries. A granite monument located near Lookout Mountain in Burnet County summarizes the history and importance of the Fisher-Miller Land Grant and was designated as a Recorded Texas Historic Landmark in 1964, Marker number 9438.

== Counties within Fisher–Miller Land Grant ==
Ten counties were formed from the Fisher–Miller Land Grant:

- Concho
- Kimble
- Llano
- Mason
- McCulloch
- Menard
- Schleicher
- San Saba
- Sutton
- Tom Green

== Republic of Texas land grants ==
The Republic of Texas issued colonization land grants with individuals and conditional upon said individuals establishing settlements in a stated geographical area of Texas. They were limited to a given time period in which the colonization had to take place.

== Fisher and Miller ==
On February 8, 1842, Henry Francis Fisher, Joseph Baker and Burchard Miller, representing the San Saba Colonization Company, petitioned for a land grant from the Republic of Texas. On June 7, 1842, Henry Francis Fisher and Burchard Miller received a colonization land grant to settle 1,000 immigrant families of German, Dutch, Swiss, Danish, Swedish, and Norwegian ancestry. The grant was issued as the Fisher–Miller Land Grant. The contract was renewed on September 1, 1843 by the Republic of Texas House of Representatives. The Fisher–Miller Land Grant consisted of 3,878,000 acres over 5,000 square miles between the Llano River and Colorado River, in the heart of the Comancheria. These lands constituted part of the hunting grounds of the Penateka Comanche Indians. Fisher and Miller had no success of colonization within the allotted time, but were able to get the timeline extended.

== Adelsverein ==
When Fisher and Burchard Miller sold the grant to the Adelsverein on June 26, 1844, they were aware of the dangers of settling in Comancheria, but did not inform the Verein. Likewise, the Verein accepted the sale on face value and did not question it. The Verein was also obligated to take over expenses of the San Saba Colonization Company, and to make Henry Fisher part of the Verein colonial committee.

The first Adelsverein Commissioner-General Prince Carl of Solms-Braunfels had no success in colonization of the land grant. The responsibility then fell to John O. Meusebach as his successor. Meusebach successfully negotiated a non-government peace treaty with the Penateka Comanche in 1847.

== Darmstadt Society of Forty ==
Darmstadt Society of Forty founders Hermann Spiess and Ferdinand Ludwig Herff were approached in Wiesbaden by Adelsverein Vice President and Executive Secretary-Business Director Count Carl Frederick Christian of Castell-Castell, who made a deal with them to colonize two hundred families on the Fisher–Miller Land Grant territory in Texas. In return, they were to receive $12,000 in money, livestock, equipment and provisions for a year. After the first year, the colonies were expected to support themselves. Emil Kriewitz was detailed to guide the settlers through the land grant territory. The colonies attempted were Castell, Leiningen, Bettina, Schoenburg and Meerholz in Llano County; Darmstädler Farm in Comal County; and Tusculum in Kendall County. Of these, only Castell and Tusculum (later Boerne) survives.
