= Henry Francis Fisher =

Henry Francis Fisher (in German Heinrich Franz Fischer, 1805–1867) was a German Texan. Born in Kassel, Electorate of Hesse in 1805, Fisher left the mainland in late 1833 spending a year each, in London and New York, and two years in New Orleans. He crossed into Texas either in 1837 or early 1838, stopping in Houston, Texas, where he served as consul to the Hanseatic League (Bremen) Texas. He became interested in the exploration and colonization of the San Saba, Texas, area and, in 1839, was acting treasurer of the San Saba Company, which was later reorganized as the San Saba Colonization Company. He played a key role in the Fisher–Miller Land Grant. He spoke German, as well as Spanish and English, when Texas came under Mexican and U.S. rules.
