= Llano River =

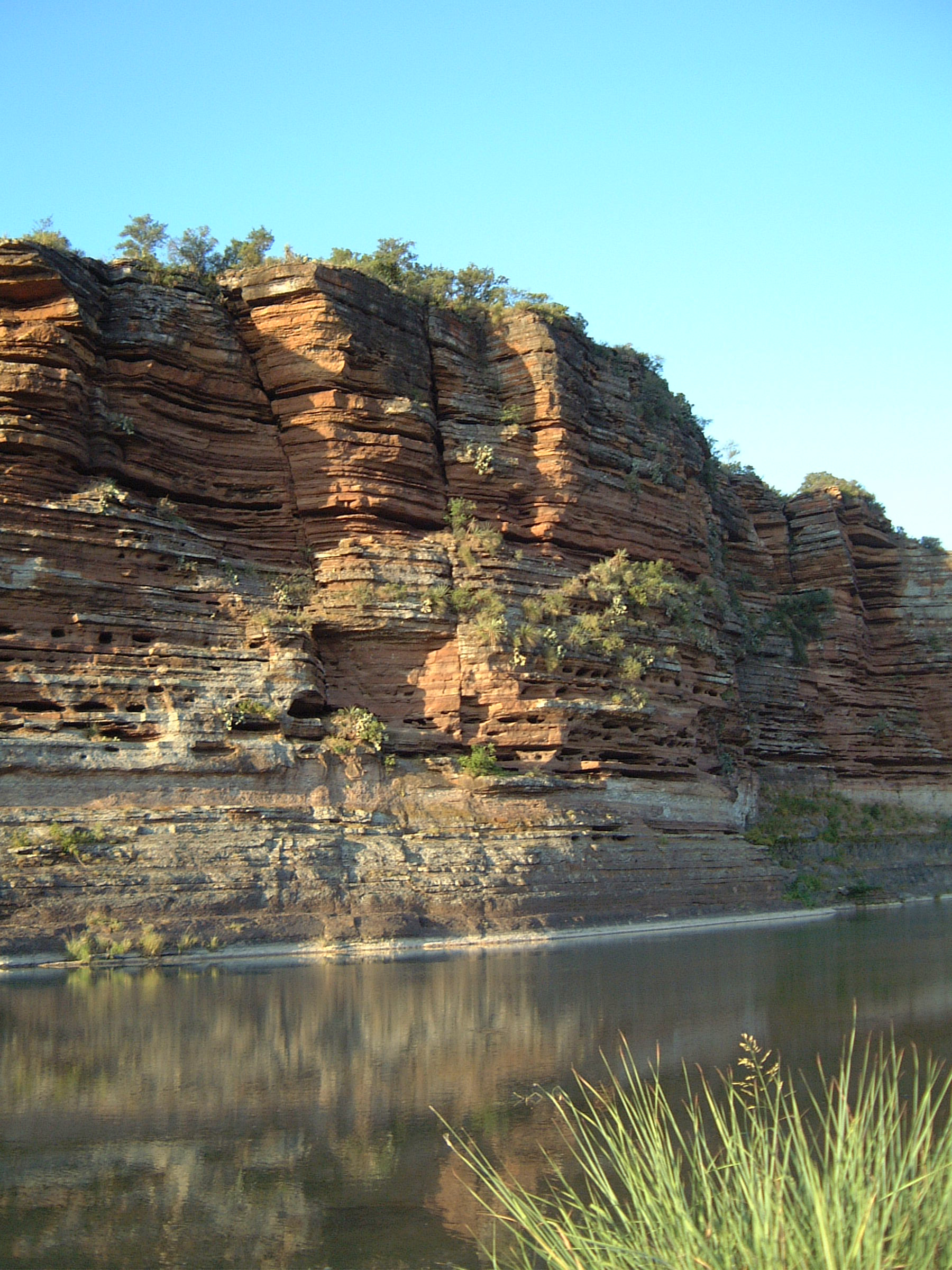
- Sandstone bluffs along the Llano River, Mason County

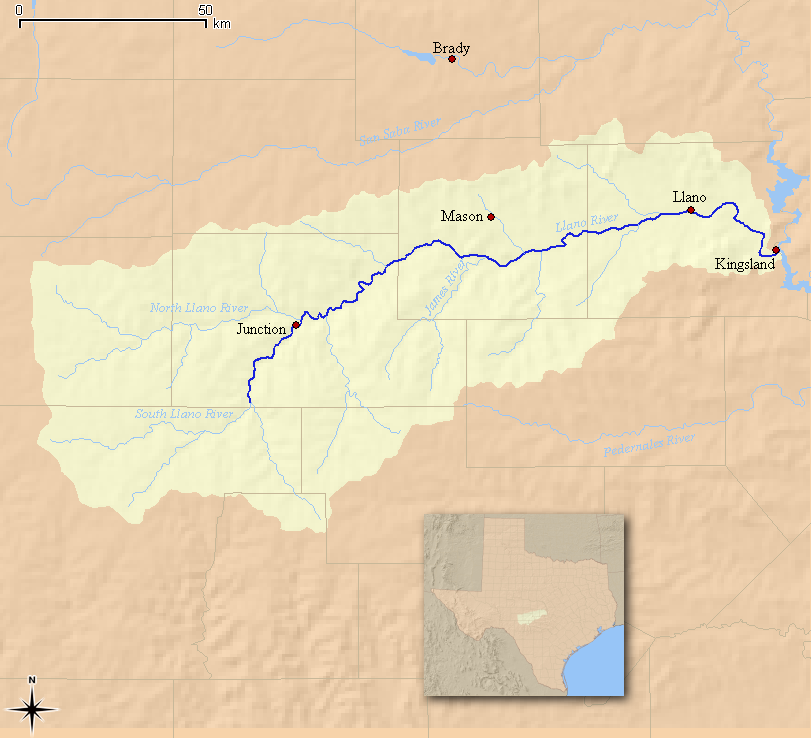
- Map of the Llano River and associated watershed

Location
- Country: United States
- State: Texas
- Region: Edwards Plateau

Physical characteristics
- Source: Confluence of North and South Llano
  - location: Junction, Edwards Plateau
  - coordinates: 30°29′33″N 099°45′22″W
  - elevation: 827 m (2,713 ft)
- Mouth: Colorado River
  - location: Kingsland, Texas Hill Country
  - coordinates: 30°39′19″N 98°25′46″W
  - elevation: 252 m (827 ft)
- Length: 169 km (105 mi)

The Llano River (/ˈlænoʊ/ LAN-oh) is a tributary of the Colorado River, about 105 miles (169 km) long, in Texas in the United States. It drains part of the Edwards Plateau in Texas Hill Country northwest of Austin.

Two spring-fed tributaries, the North and South Llano, stretch across the otherwise arid lands of West Texas before merging just east of the small town of Junction, in Kimble County, forming the head of the Llano River proper. The Llano River runs generally east-northeast through the rolling limestone terrain of the Edwards Plateau as it flows through Kimble County and across rural Mason County, passing to the south of the town of Mason, Texas. Continuing in an easterly direction, the river carves its way through the Llano Uplift, a roughly circular geologic dome of Precambrian rock, primarily granite, located in Central Texas. Flowing through Llano County, the river passes to the north of Enchanted Rock and flows through the town of Llano, Texas. Northeast of Llano, it turns sharply to the southeast, joining the Colorado from the northwest as an arm of Lake Lyndon B. Johnson, about 15 miles (24 km) southeast of Llano at Kingsland.

This river is one of the few popular fly fishing destinations in the state of Texas, and contains Guadalupe bass, the state fish of Texas. The Llano also contains largemouth bass, Longnose gar, Spotted gar, and various sunfish.

The river is also associated with the legend of the Los Almagres Mine. Translated from Spanish, almagre means red ochre. In 1756, the lieutenant-general of Texas (then still a province of New Spain), Don Bernardo de Miranda, launched an expedition from San Fernando (San Antonio), to ascertain whether rumors of rich mineral deposits to the north were true. As the legend goes, Miranda came across a cave in the side of a hill in the vicinity of the Rio de las Chanas (Llano River), and reported astounding quantities of silver to be found within.

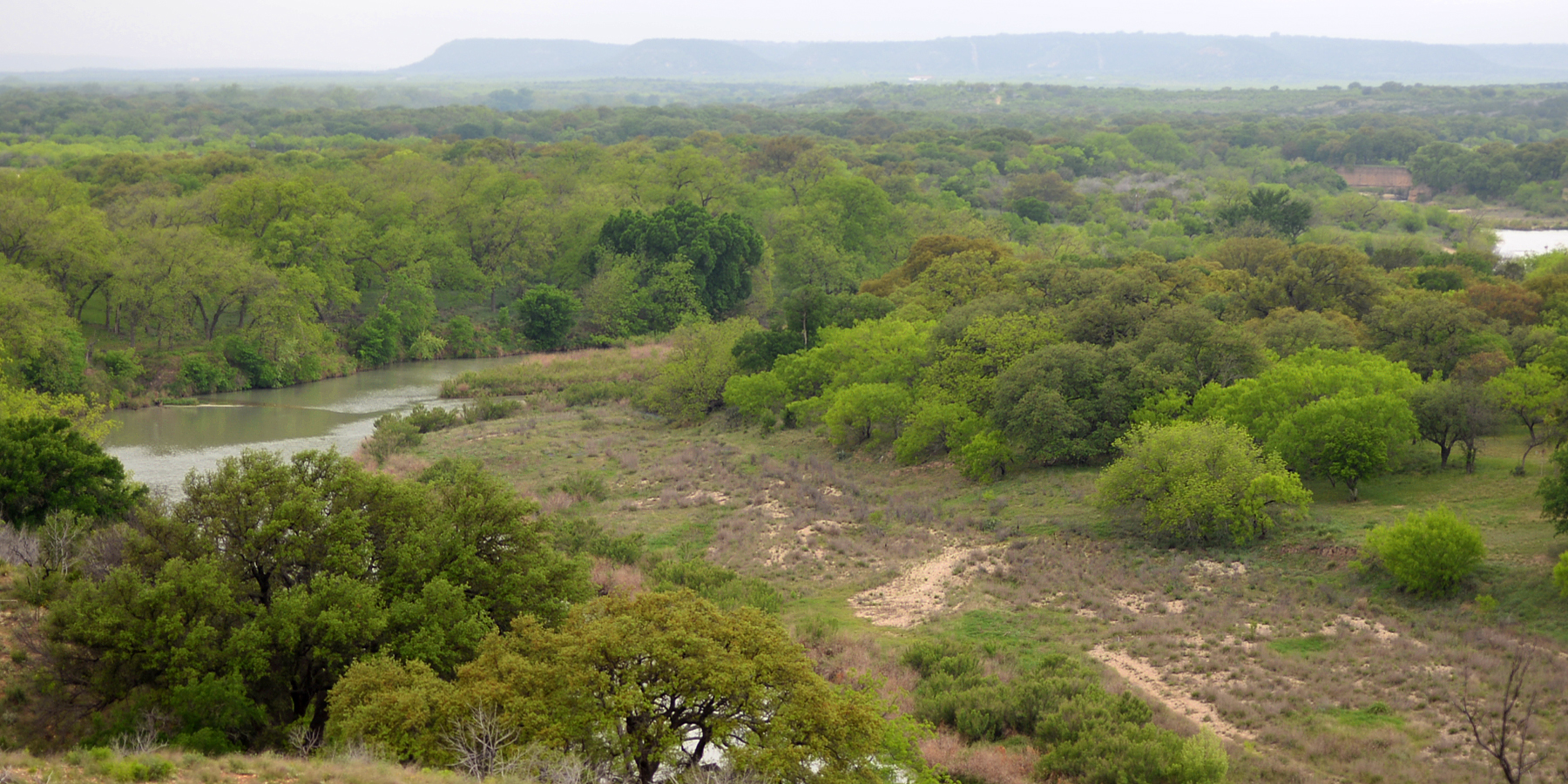
Llano River from County Road 320, Kimble County, Texas, USA (17 April 2015)

== 2018 flood ==
On October 9, 2018, a cold front swept through the hill country where it encountered the remnants of Hurricane Sergio. Mason County saw 10" of rain and Lake Travis saw a 3' rise. In Junction, Texas, the flow rate increased from its normal rate of 111 cubic feet per second (cfs) to 118,000 cfs.

Less than a week later the remnants of Hurricane Willa rolled into the area, followed by another front, on October 16, 2018. Upwards of a foot of rain fell in Llano, Texas. The flow rate of the Llano River, in Llano, had increased from its normal rate of 150 cfs to 275,000 cfs. The river crested at 39.9 feet, its highest level in more than 80 years and just 1.5 feet below its record high of 41.5 ft, set in 1935. The high flow rate caused the RM 2900 bridge in Kingsland to collapse and what used to be a two-minute drive across town became a 40-50 minute drive.

The flooding was so intense that the Colorado River began to flow backwards briefly.

The flood waters entered into the Colorado River and flood gates on every dam on the Texas Highland Lakes were opened. Lake Travis rose 25 feet in 24 hours and water flowed into it at a rate of 375,000 cfs. The flooding raised the turbidity of City of Austin's water supply (which is sourced exclusively from the Colorado River) to untenable levels, forcing the city to issue a seven-day boil water notice

By December 2018 payments under the National Flood Insurance Program had exceeded $22 million

In the end, two people died as a result of the floods. The RM 2900 bridge in Kingsland was rebuilt less than a year later.

== See also ==
- Colorado River (Texas)
- Pedernales River
- Flash Flood Alley
- Frio River
- Brazos River
- Double Mountain Fork Brazos River
- White River (Texas)
- Pecos River
- Rio Grande
- List of rivers of Texas
