= List of German Texans =

German Texans have historically played a role in history of the U.S. state of Texas.

Texans of German birth or descent have, since the mid-19th century, made up one of the largest ethnic groups in the state. By 1850, they numbered 5% of the total population—a conservative count. The 1990 census listed more than 17% of the population, nearly three million individuals, claiming German heritage.

== Notable German Texans ==
- Robert Nason Beck
- Prince Carl of Solms-Braunfels
- Katherine Center
- Edward Degener
- Friedrich Diercks (or Johann Friedrich Ernst)
- Dr. Carl Adolph Douai
- Dwight D. Eisenhower
- Henry Francis Fisher
- O. C. Fisher
- John Frels
- William Frels
- Justin Furstenfeld
- Summer Glau
- Phil Hardberger
- Laura Harring
- Ferdinand Ludwig Herff
- Betty Holekamp
- Engelbert Krauskopf
- Pastor John Kilian
- Ralph Kirshbaum
- Louis Kleberg
- Robert J. Kleberg
- Bob Krueger
- Jacob Kuechler
- Ferdinand Lindheimer
- Tom Loeffler
- Hermann Lungkwitz
- Charles W. Machemehl
- Chuck Machemehl
- Johann Machemehl
- Louis A. Machemehl
- Paul Machemehl
- John O. Meusebach (or Baron Ottfried Hans Freiherr von Meusebach)
- Burchard Miller
- Gus Franklin Mutscher
- Randy Neugebauer
- Elisabet Ney
- Chester W. Nimitz
- Bonnie Parker
- Friedrich Richard Petri
- Robert Rauschenberg
- Bob Schieffer
- Gustav Schleicher
- Kevin Schwantz
- Zachary Selig
- Kel Seliger
- August Siemering
- Hermann Spiess
- Jordan Spieth
- Nick Stahl
- Friedrich Armand Strubberg
- Johann Ludwig Karl Heinrich von Struve
- Count Ludwig Joseph von Boos-Waldeck
- Ferdinand von Roemer
- Arlene Wohlgemuth
- Harry M. Wurzbach

== See also ==
- German American
- German Americans in the American Civil War
- List of people from Texas
- List of German Americans
- Nueces massacre
