= Jacob Bickler =

German scholar and educator (1849–1902)

- Born: November 20, 1849; Bad Sobernheim, Kingdom of Prussia
- Died: April 30, 1902 (aged 52); Austin, Texas, US
- Resting place: Oakwood Cemetery
- Education: University of Wisconsin (B.A.)
- Occupations: Scholar; Educator
- Spouse: Martha Lungkwitz
- Children: Jenny Marie (1875–1949); Camilla Therese (1876-1949); Harry Pitt (1879–1958); Max Hermann (1881–1971); Katherine Magdalene (1883–1963); Viola Babetta (1886–1892); Jacob Franz (1888–1891); Ralph Adolph (1891–1974); George Washington (1893–1983)

Jacob Bickler (November 29, 1849 – April 30, 1902) was a German-born American scholar and educator, who was president of the Texas State Teacher's Association. He was founder of the boys' Texas German and English Academy and the co-educational Bickler Academy, both located in Austin, Texas. In 1969, Recorded Historic Texas Landmark 6438 was placed at the site of the Goodman Building, noting the location on the second floor of Jacob Bickler's German and English academy.

== Early life ==
Jacob Bickler was born on November 20, 1849, in Bad Sobernheim, Kingdom of Prussia, to Peter Bickler and his wife Katherine Schöffling Bickler. He received his early education in the public schools of Bad Sobernheim. Peter Bickler married a second time and moved to Milwaukee, where the teenaged Jacob joined the new couple in 1863. From 1863 to 1867, young Bickler attended Milwaukee high schools and Milwaukee Markham Academy College Preparatory School. In 1870, Bickler earned his Bachelor of Arts in pedagogics from the University of Wisconsin–Milwaukee. He became fluent in six languages. From 1871 to 1872, Bicker was a principal in the educational system of La Crosse, Wisconsin.

== Texas ==
On December 24, 1872, Jacob Bickler moved to Austin, Texas, and joined his uncle Philip Bickler in teaching at the Bickler German English Academy, where artist Carl G. von Iwonski had also once taught. Land Commissioner Jacob Kuechler appointed Bickler assistant draftsman and calculator in the Texas General Land Office on April 1, 1873. On January 24, 1874, the date of Bickler's wedding, he resigned from the Texas General Land Office to resume his teaching career.

In 1876, Bickler founded the Texas German and English Academy in Austin, a boys' school that remained in operation until 1902. In 1880, the Wahrenberger House in Austin was leased to Bickler. He operated the academy at this house. According to the Texas Historical Commission, the school was located here until 1886. Conflicting information, though, states that the academy was located in the Texas Military Institute Castle in Austin from 1884 to 1887. Bickler conceivably started the academy in the Wahrenberger House and kept his headquarters there, while moving the institute to the larger location as enrollment grew. In 1887, Bickler was elected president of the Texas State Teachers Association. He served as superintendent of Galveston public schools 1887–1892. In 1892, he founded the co-educational Bickler Academy in Austin, which was located in the Goodman Building until 1897. In 1969, Recorded Historic Texas Landmark 6438 was placed at the site of the Goodman Building, noting the location on the second floor of Jacob Bickler's German and English academy. In summer months, Bickler taught classes at both Fredericksburg and Mason.

Bickler was a member of the summer faculty at the University of Texas. He was a leading proponent for establishment of the 1891 College of Education at the university.

== Personal life and death ==
On January 24, 1874, Bickler married Martha Lungkwitz, daughter of artist Hermann Lungkwitz. The couple had nine children, eight of whom survived infancy.

Jacob Bickler died in Austin on April 30, 1902, and is buried in Oakwood Cemetery in Austin, Texas.

== Memberships ==
- Ancient Order of United Workmen
- National Education Association
- President (1886–1887), Texas State Teacher's Association

== Memorials ==
- 1902 Jacob Bickler Medallion, artist Elisabet Ney
