= Feltin =

Feltin is a surname. Notable people with the surname include:

- Louise Feltin (1830-1905), Catholic Nun from Alsatia
- Maurice Feltin (1883-1975), French Cardinal
