= Pedernales, Texas =

- Ghost town
- Location within Texas Location within the United States
- Coordinates: 30°12′33″N 98°56′39″W
- Country: United States
- State: Texas
- County: Gillespie
- Time zone: UTC-6 (Central (CST))
  - Summer (DST): UTC-5 (CDT)
- FIPS code

Pedernales was an early settlement of German immigrants in Gillespie County, Texas, United States, and was part of the Adelsverein colonization of Texas. No trace of the settlement remains today. It was located 7 miles (11 km) southwest of Fredericksburg near what is now Texas State Highway 16. The Pedernales school received a Texas Historical Commission Subject Marker in 1993, Marker number 10095.

== Establishment ==
In 1846, Wilhelm Victor Keidel moved to Fredericksburg, becoming Gillespie County's first physician, and in 1848 the county's first Chief Justice. He was one of the individuals who signed the petition to create Gillespie County on December 15, 1847.

Keidel relocated 7 miles (11 km) southwest of Fredericksburg to the banks of the Pedernales River and founded a settlement he named Pedernales. For any settlers who would relocate with him to the settlement, he agreed to give them free medical care. Keidel became the first leader of the community. Among the other early residents were photographer and landscape artist Hermann Lungkwitz and his brother-in-law and fellow painter Friedrich Richard Petri. After the Bettina community failed circa 1848, Jacob Kuechler and his wife Marie Petri Kuechler moved to Pedernales, to join the family business. By 1850 the settlement had 44 residents of German descent.

== Pedernales school ==
On September 11, 1854, Keidel hosted a meeting to plan Live Oak School and was elected trustee. A decade later, Pedernales had its own school district, along with two stores and a cotton gin. The school supported grades 1 through 7, all taught by one teacher. The schoolhouse was of native limestone. Community activities centered on the school, and year-end exams were called "schulpruefung", followed by a celebratory picnic. Private tuition and the state of Texas funded the school. Enrollment dipped during World War II, and the Pedernales school was consolidated in 1949 with the Wrede School, closer to Fredericksburg. The original school is now a private home, and nothing else remains of the settlement.
