= Frelsburg, Texas =

- Unincorporated community
- Location within the state of Texas Frelsburg (the United States)
- Coordinates: 29°52′16″N 96°32′51″W
- Country: United States
- State: Texas
- County: Colorado
- Elevation: 302 ft (92 m)
- Time zone: UTC-6 (Central (CST))
  - Summer (DST): UTC-5 (CDT)
- ZIP code: 78950
- Area code: 979

Frelsburg is an unincorporated community in Colorado County, Texas, United States. According to the Handbook of Texas, the community had a population of 75 in 2000.

== History ==
Capt. William Frels and his brother John, who arrived in Texas in 1834 on the ship Congress from Germany, founded the settlement sometime around 1837. After the country gained its freedom, Captain Frels, who had served in the revolutionary army, gave the land for the townsite, a parsonage, a Protestant church, and a cemetery. Germans from the region surrounding Oldenburg and Holstein made up the first settlers. The population had grown to the point where a post office was needed by 1847, and a Saints Peter and Paul Catholic Church was established by recent Rhineland immigrants. Community life exhibited the influence of the Texas frontier as well as the German heritage, sustained by an economy centered on small farms akin to those in Germany. The town boasted a cotton gin, a few stores, and several service industry members, including harnessmakers and blacksmiths, by 1852. Following the Civil War, Frelsburg's economy flourished, and a large portion of the surrounding land was used to grow cotton. Farmers in the area attribute the creation of the first mechanized cotton distributor and cleaner for gins to Frank Walls, Sr. The Missouri-Kansas-Texas Railroad subsequently passed through Columbus several miles to the north. In the 1870s, the main line of the Galveston, Harrisburg, and San Antonio Railway traveled through Columbus. With an estimated 300 residents, Frelsburg boasted five cotton gins, four gristmills, three churches, and a sawmill in 1884. Through the first half of the 1900s, Frelsburg remained rich even after being bypassed by the railroads. In 1908, the post office there closed. The majority of the small farms in the area switched to raising beef cattle after the 1950s. When the nearby Frelsburg gas field was discovered, more land was taken out of crop cultivation, and absentee ownership was encouraged. From 1933 until 2000, Frelsburg's population was recorded as 75.

It was described as a German freethinking community.

== Geography ==
Frelsburg is located at the intersection of Farm to Market Roads 109 and 1291, 12 mi (19 km) north of Columbus and 10 mi (16 km) east of Fayetteville in the northern corner of Colorado County.

== Education ==
Captain Frels donated land for a school after the state's independence. The state selected Frelsburg as the location for Hermann University in 1870, but after the structure was completed, there weren't enough supporters to support the institution. As a result, the building was sold to the nearby school district. Today, the community is served by the Columbus Independent School District.

Sister Louise Feltin sent sisters from her Catholic organization to open a school in Frelsburg in 1871.

== Gallery ==
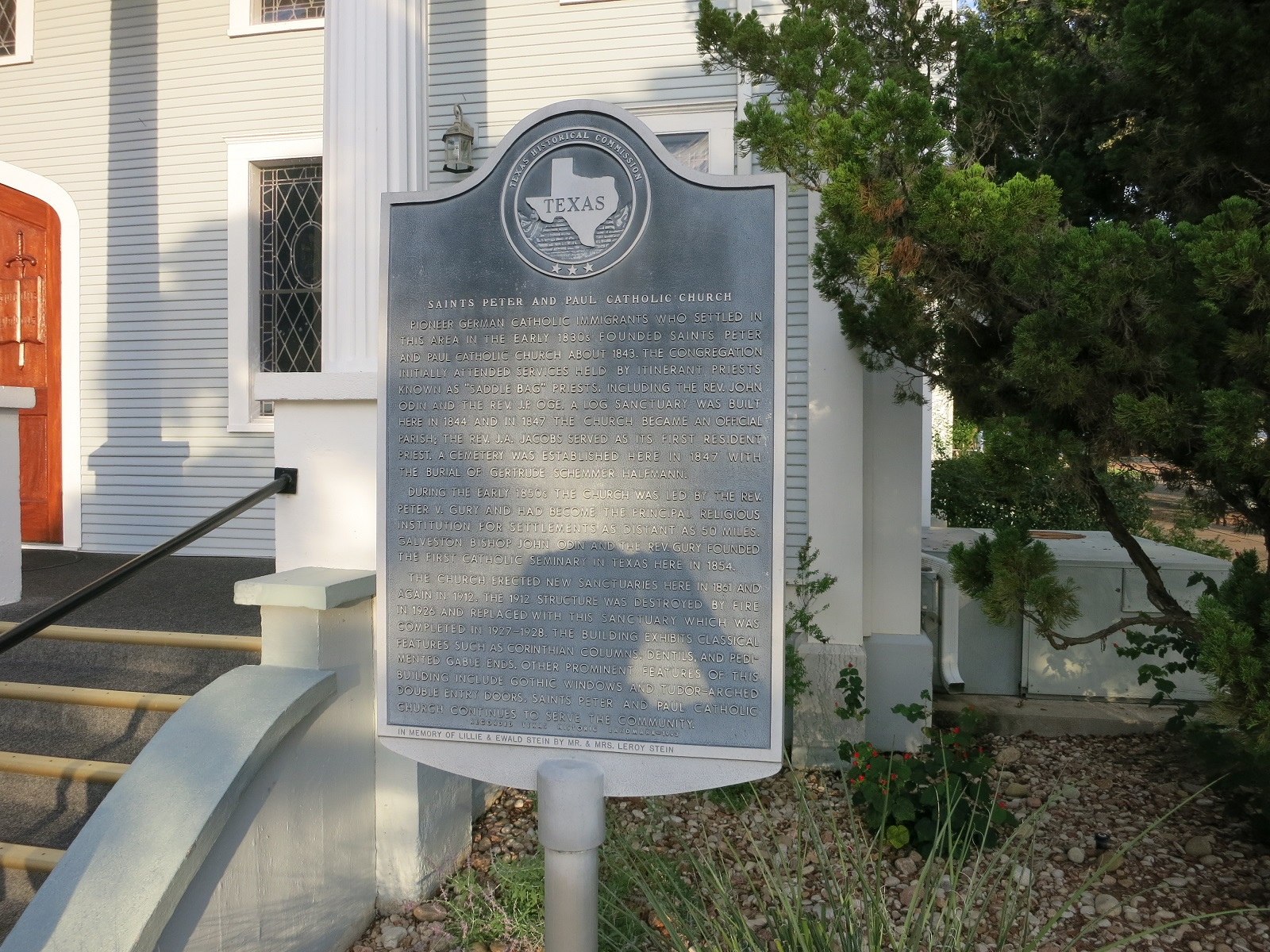
Texas State Historical Marker at Saints Peter and Paul Catholic Church

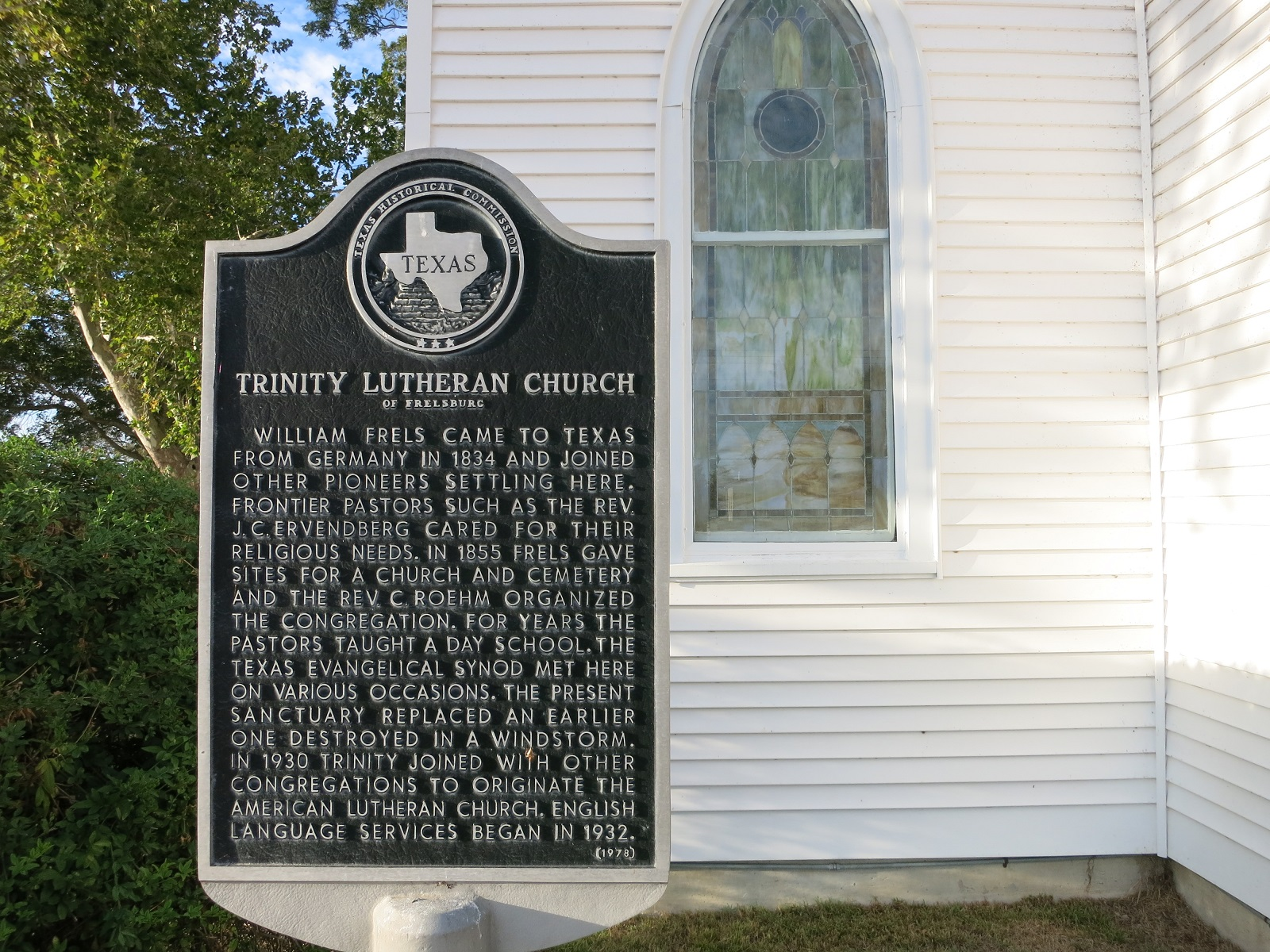
Texas State Historical Marker at Trinity Lutheran Church

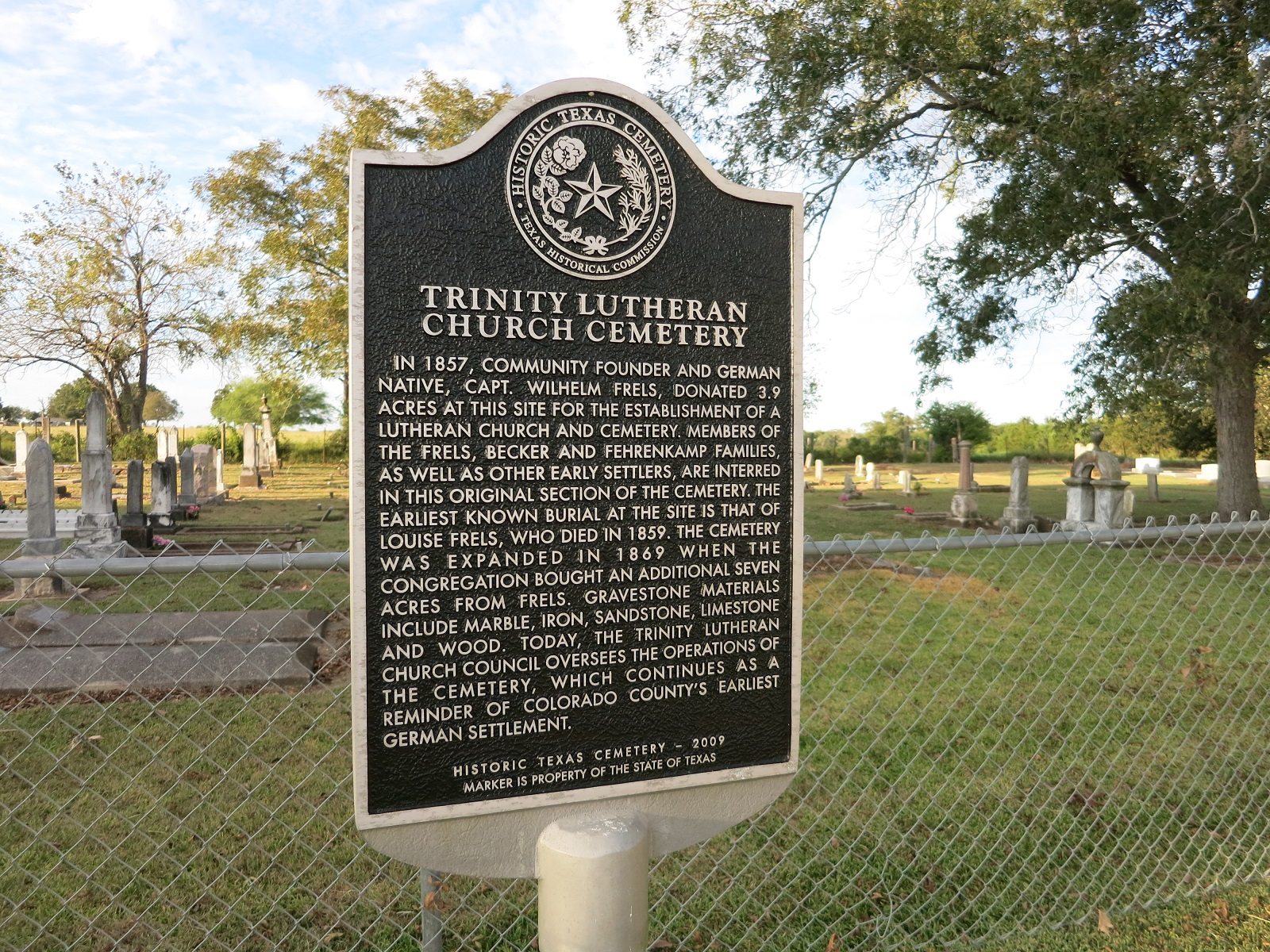
Texas State Historical Marker at Trinity Lutheran Cemetery

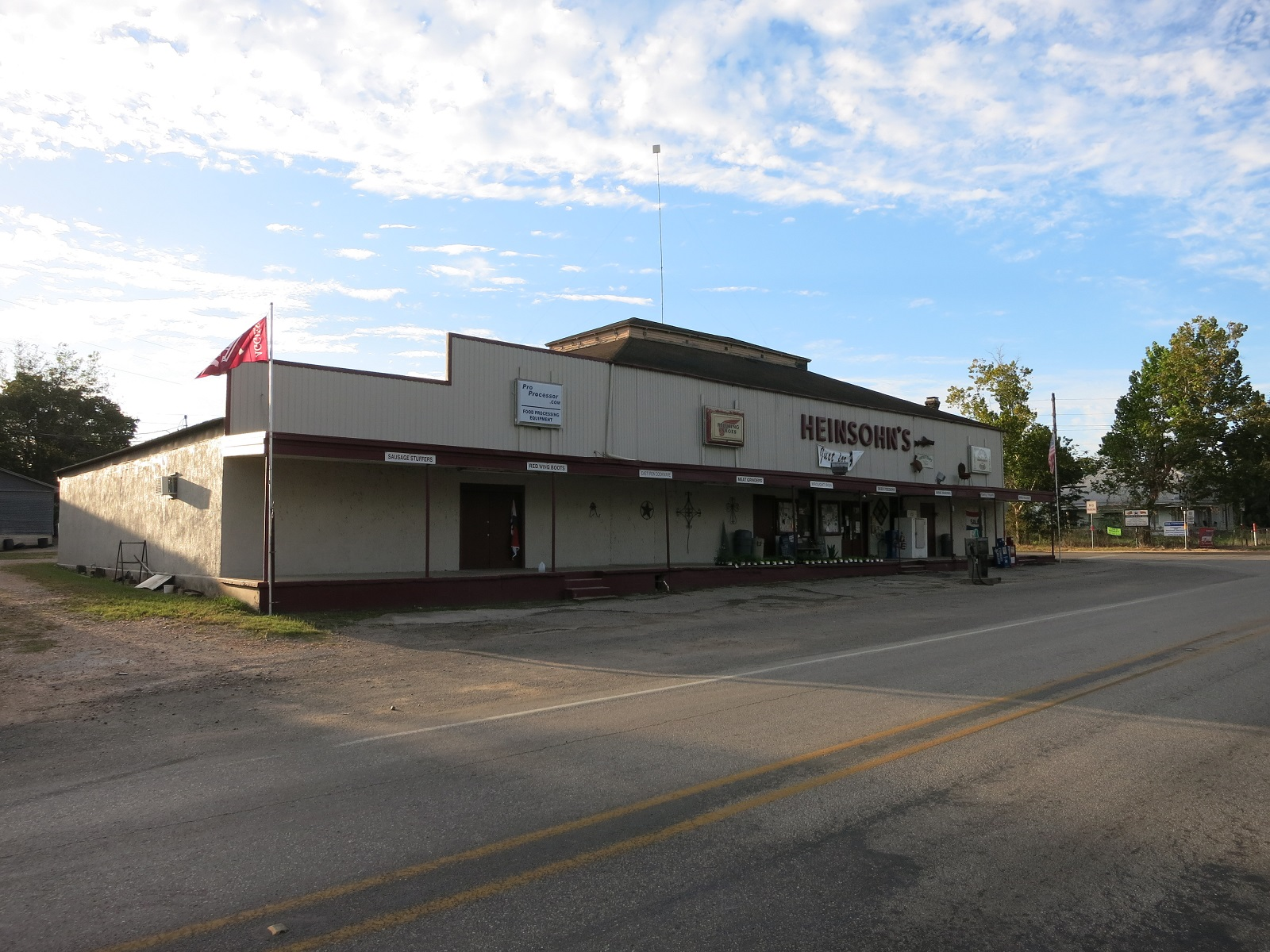
Heinsohn's Country Store at FM 109 and FM 1291

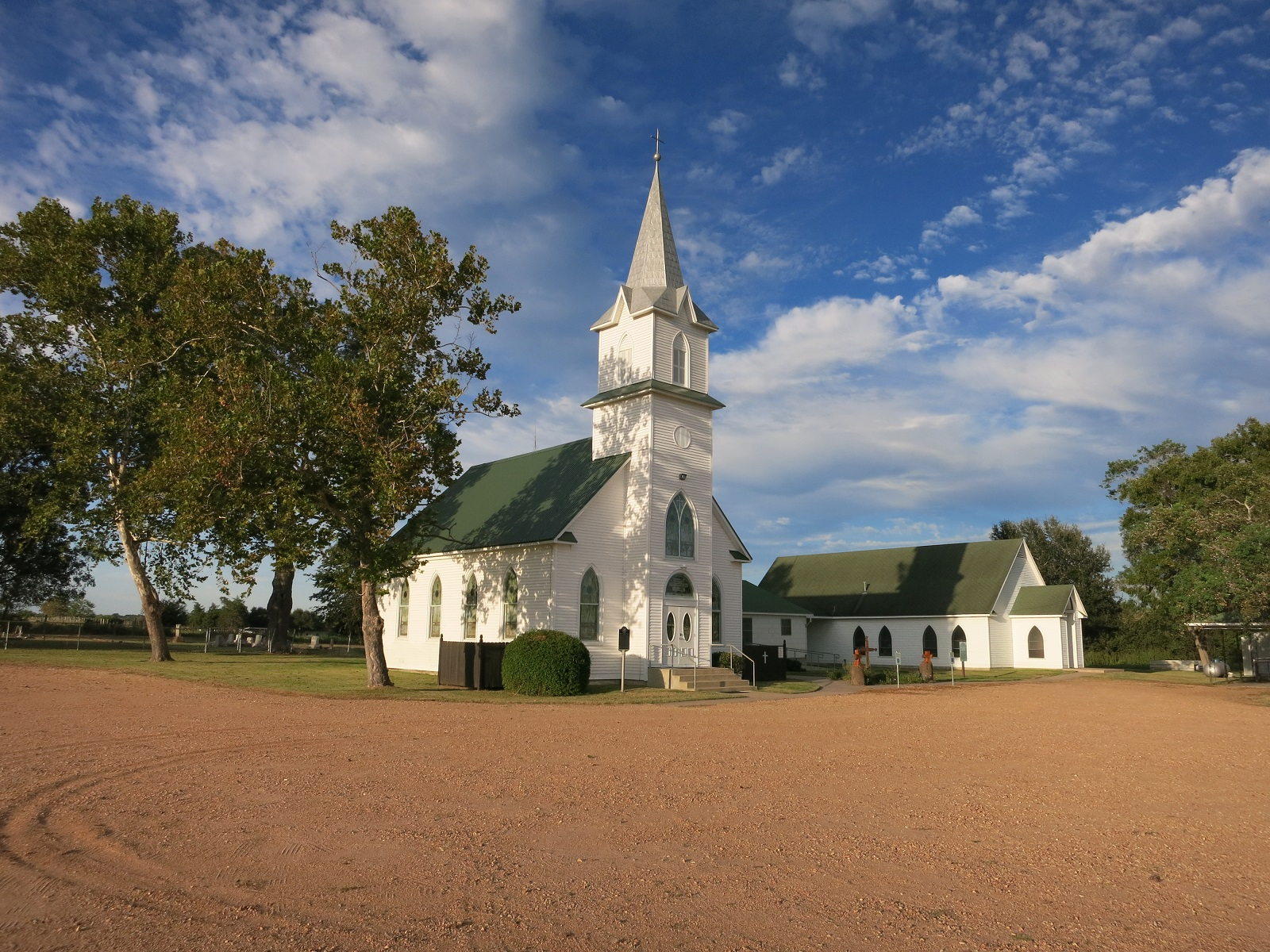
Trinity Lutheran Church in Frelsburg

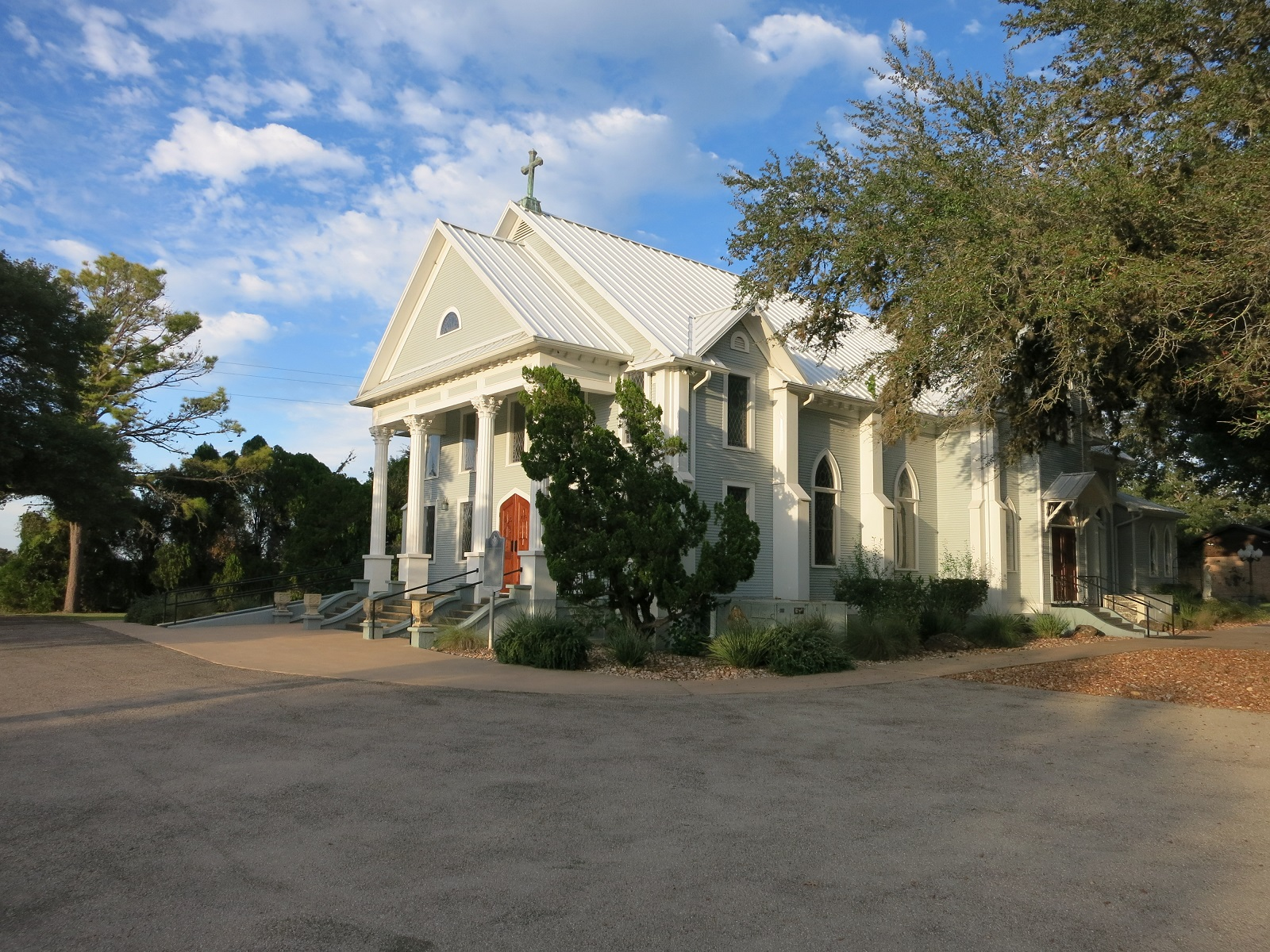
Saints Peter and Paul Catholic Church in Frelsburg, listed on the National Register of Historic Places
