= Goodman Building (Austin, Texas) =

- U.S. National Register of Historic Places
- Recorded Texas Historic Landmark
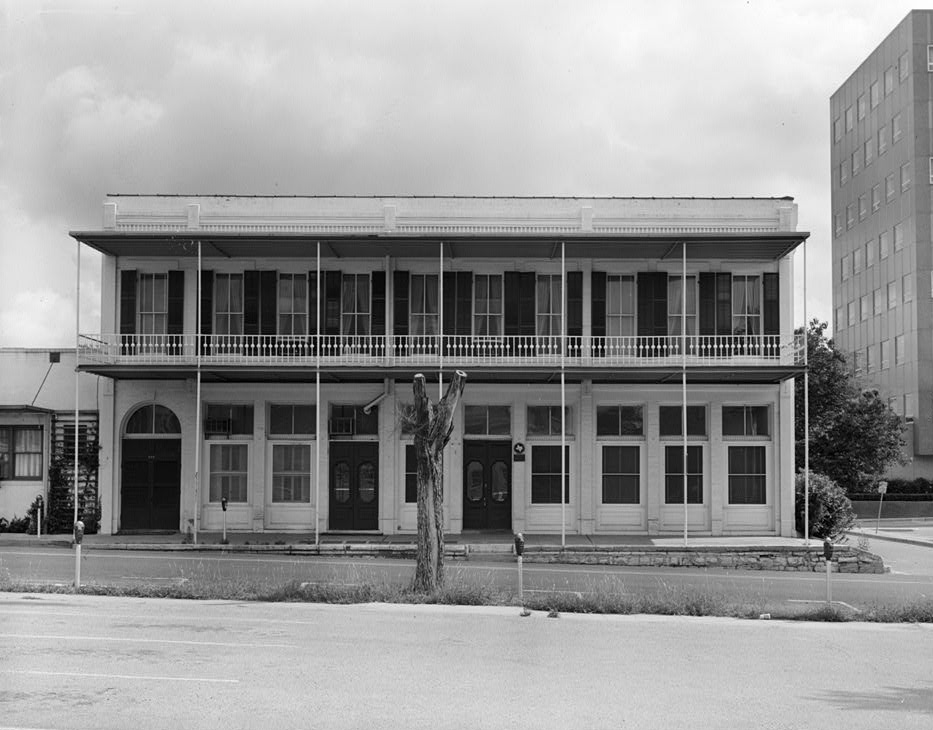
- South Elevation of the Goodman Building, photographed in July 1974 by Roy Pledger for the Historic American Buildings Survey
- Location: Austin, Texas, USA
- Coordinates: 30°16′32.67″N 97°44′31.75″W
- NRHP reference No.: 73001976
- RTHL No.: 6438

Significant dates
- Added to NRHP: April 13, 1973
- Designated RTHL: 1969

The Goodman Building is a late Victorian style historic commerce building in downtown Austin, Texas, United States. It was constructed as a grocery in the mid-1880s to serve Austinites northwest of the Texas State Capitol. Today it serves as a state government adjunct office. A local bar, "The Cloak Room", occupies the basement. It is located at 202 W. 13th Street. The building was added to the National Register of Historic Places in 1973.

== Texas Historical Commission Marker Text ==
Constructed in the 1880s for Joseph Goodman, grocer in this block 1877–1924. Jacob Bickler's German and English academy, elite preparatory school, was on upper floor 1892–1896. Building is noted for rare brick work, ornamental iron.

== Gallery ==
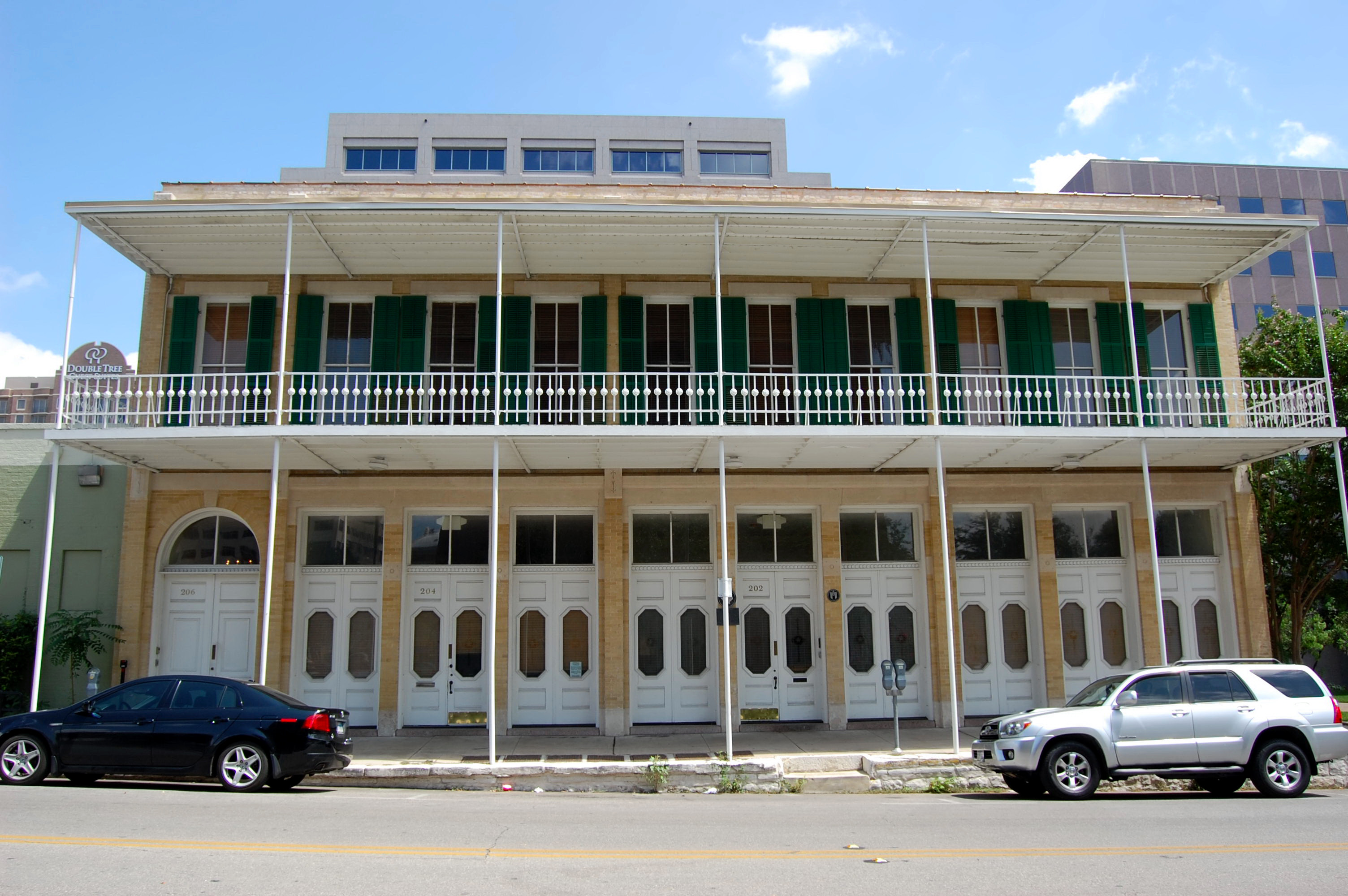
