= Wilhelm Victor Keidel =

German physician and judge

- Born: March 2, 1825; Hildesheim, Kingdom of Hanover, Germany
- Died: January 9, 1870 (aged 44)
- Resting place: Kott Family Cemetery, Gillespie County, Texas
- Citizenship: American
- Education: Georg Augusts Universität in Göttingen
- Occupation: Physician
- Known for: First physician Gillespie Co. First Chief Justice Gillespie Co. Founder Pedernales, Texas
- Spouse(s): Albertina Kramer (d. 1852); Caroline Kott (1856–1865)
- Children: 2
- Parent: Dr. Georg Keidel

Wilhelm Victor Keidel (March 2, 1825 – January 9, 1870) was the first medical doctor, as well as first Chief Justice, in Gillespie County, Texas. He was a veteran of the Mexican–American War. Keidel founded the settlement of Pedernales.

== Early life ==
Wilhelm Victor Keidel was born in Hildesheim, Kingdom of Hanover, Germany, on March 2, 1825, to Dr. Georg Keidel. He attended Georg Augusts Universität in Göttingen from 1841 to 1845.

On September 1, 1845, at the age of twenty, Keidel boarded the Brig Margaretha, captained by a man named Libben, in Bremen, Germany and disembarked in Galveston, Texas, on December 1, 1845.

== Gillespie County ==
In the Mexican–American War, fellow German colonist and veteran of the French Foreign Legion Augustus Buchel formed the First Regiment of Texas Foot Rifles, serving as its captain. Emil Kriewitz was a co-founding member of the company of eighty volunteers. Keidel enlisted with the unit. On May 22, 1846, the company was drafted into the service of Col. Albert Sidney Johnston as Company H, First Texas Rifle Volunteers. The unit saw service at Matamoros, Tamaulipas and Camargo. A combination of bad climate and bad living conditions decimated the unit, most of whom were discharged.

Upon discharge, Keidel moved to Fredericksburg. He was appointed by John O. Meusebach to be the Verein physician in Fredericksburg, Gillespie County's first doctor. At the age of twenty-three, he became the county's first Chief Justice in 1848.

He relocated and founded the Pedernales Settlement on the river of the same name, where he became the leader. For any settlers who would relocate with him to the settlement, he agreed to give them free medical care. By 1850 the settlement had forty-four residents of German descent. On September 11, 1854, he hosted a meeting to plan Live Oak School and was elected trustee. Keidel founded the political and cultural club Society for Good Fellowship and Promotion of General Information. His community beautification project was to plant hackberry trees along local roads.

Keidel gave medical treatment to both whites and Native Americans without regard to race. The Native Americans paid Keidel with fresh venison and turkeys. During the American Civil War, Keidel refused align himself with either side, and gave medical care where needed, without regard to the allegiance of the patient.

== State Convention of Germans ==
Keidel was elected vice president of the 1854 State Convention of Germans in San Antonio. The meeting adopted a political, social and religious platform, including: 1) Equal pay for equal work; 2) Direct election of the President of the United States; 3) Abolition of capital punishment; 4) "Slavery is an evil, the abolition of which is a requirement of democratic principles.."; 5) Free schools – including universities – supported by the state, without religious influence; and 6) Total separation of church and state.

== Personal life and death ==
Dr. Keidel was married and widowed twice. His first wife Albertina Kramer died in childbirth on July 1, 1852. Their son Dr. Albert Keidel built the Keidel Memorial Hospital in Fredericksburg. Albert died December 21, 1914. Keidel's second marriage was to Caroline Kott of the Bear community in 1856. Caroline's health declined while she was carrying the couple's son Herman in 1865. The family relocated back to Fredericksburg. Following the birth of their son Herman, Caroline died of a fever in August 1865.

Victor Keidel died of typhus pneumonia on January 9, 1870, and is buried with his second wife and her sister in the Kott Family Cemetery in Gillespie County.
