= Emil Kriewitz =

Texas settler (1822–1902)

- Born: Emil von Kriewitz de Czepry; January 18, 1822; Zinna, Germany
- Died: May 21, 1902 (aged 80); Castell, Texas, US
- Resting place: Llano Cemetery
- Known for: Texas Adelsverein settler Lived with Comanches
- Spouse: Amelia Markwordt
- Children: Eight

Emil Kriewitz (January 18, 1822 – May 21, 1902) was a German immigrant and veteran of the Mexican–American War, who came to this country with the Adelsverein colonists. After John O. Meusebach successfully negotiated the Meusebach–Comanche Treaty, Kriewitz lived among the Penateka Comanche as an intermediary between the whites and Penateka. In 1993, his home in Castell, Texas, was designated a Recorded Texas Historic Landmark, Marker number 9444.

== Early life ==
Emil von Kriewitz de Czepry was born on January 18, 1822, in Zinna, Germany.

== Texas ==
Kriewitz emigrated to Texas as part of the Adelsverein colonization program. He left Bremen, Germany, on October 28, 1845 aboard the Franziska, and disembarked at Galveston, Texas on January 11, 1846. From there, Kriewitz accompanied other Adelsverein colonists to Indianola, which Adelsverein Commissioner-General Prince Carl of Solms-Braunfels had renamed Carlshafen in honor of himself, Count Carl of Castell-Castell and Count Victor August of Leiningen-Westerburg-Alt-Leiningen whom Solms claimed had been christened Carl. Prince Solms' choice of Carlshafen and its inadequate accommodations as a port of entry, as well as the isolated route to New Braunfels, was to keep the Germans from interacting with any Americans.

John O. Meusebach, as successor to Prince Solms, had arranged with the Torrey brothers for transporting the colonists inland, but the United States hired the Torrey brothers for use in the Mexican–American War to serve Zachary Taylor's army in Corpus Christi. An epidemic of spinal meningitis broke out at Carlshafen and spread with the emigrants to New Braunfels and Fredericksburg. Fellow German colonist and veteran of the French Foreign Legion Augustus Buchel formed the First Regiment of Texas Foot Rifles, serving as its captain. Kriewitz was a co-founding member of the company of 80 volunteers. On May 22, 1846, the company was drafted into the service of Col. Albert Sidney Johnston as Company H, First Texas Rifle Volunteers. The unit saw service at Matamoros, Tamaulipas and Camargo. A combination of bad climate and bad living conditions decimated the unit, and most of the members were discharged.

== Life with the Comanches ==
May 9, 1847, the vested party representatives of the Penateka Comanche and German colonists met in Fredericksburg to ratify and sign the "Treaty Between the Comanche and the German Immigration Company". In accordance with the terms of the treaty, Meusebach paid the Penateka Comanches $3,000, slightly less than $70,000 in today's money, in food, gifts and other commodities for their participation in the signing of the agreement. The Penateka also requested that a representative of the German colonists serve as an in-house intermediary and live among them. Kriewitz was assigned to be the intermediary, and went to live at the camp of war chief Santa Anna. In the camp, Kriewitz began to assimilate into the culture to gain the confidence and friendship of Santa Anna, who otherwise was not totally trustful of the white settlers.

Santa Anna's group traveled to New Braunfels in August 1847 to meet with Meusebach and his successor Hermann Spiess. Because of his assimilated appearance, the German parties did not recognize Kriewitz, whom Santa Anna had forbidden to speak during the meeting. Kriewitz communicated with the German parties by tapping one beneath the negotiating table, which prompted the German to pass a pencil and paper to Kriewitz under the table. Kriewitz was able to slip out to visit friends, but Santa Anna became distrusting thereafter. Afterward, Kriewitz requested, and received, permission from Santa Anna to visit his old friend Wilhelm Victor Keidel, who had served with him in the Mexican War. Kriewitz, however, never returned to the Penateka camp after that.

== Settlements ==
Adelsverein Vice President and Executive Secretary-Business Director Count Carl Frederick Christian of Castell-Castell, made a deal with the socialistic organization Darmstadt Society of Forty to colonize 200 families on the Fisher–Miller Land Grant territory in Texas. In return, they were to receive $12,000 in money, livestock, equipment, and provisions for a year. After the first year, the colonies were expected to support themselves. Beginning in 1847, Kriewitz was assigned with building a road into the territory and to serve as guide for the Society of Forty immigrants into the territory to begin their settlements. The society began Castell, Leiningen, Bettina, Schoenburg, and Meerholz in Llano County; Darmstädler Farm in Comal County; and Tusculum in Kendall County. Of these, only Castell survives.

== Post Comanche life ==
On December 15, 1847, Kriewitz was one of the petitioners requesting the creation of Gillespie County.

In 1852, Kriewitz settled in Castell and went into retail partnership with Franz Kettner. In 1870, Kriewitz was elected justice of the peace for Precinct Four of Llano County. In 1871, he served as a county election judge. On December 27, 1876, Kriewitz was appointed postmaster in Castell, serving until the appointment of Ed Buckholtz in 1883. Kriewitz spent the rest of his life as a rancher and land speculator.

== Personal life and death ==
In 1857, Kriewitz married Amelia Markwordt at Cherry Springs. The couple had eight children.

Emil Kriewitz died on May 21, 1902, in Castell, and is buried in the Llano City Cemetery.
