= Carl G. von Iwonski =

German-American painter

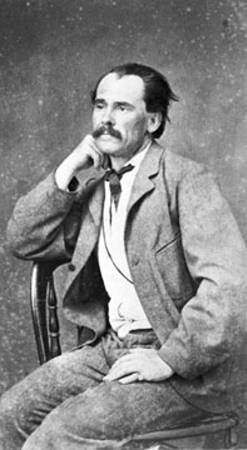
- Photograph from the Texas State Historical Association
- Born: Carl G. von Iwonski; April 23, 1830; Hilbersdorf, Saxony
- Died: April 4, 1912 (aged 81); Breslau, Germany
- Education: Berlin Academy of Art
- Known for: Painter; Sculptor

Carl G. von Iwonski (1830–1912) was a painter born in Germany who became a naturalized American citizen. He was artistically active in San Antonio and New Braunfels, and best known for his portraits of Texas pioneers.

== Early life ==
Carl G. von Iwonski was born April 23, 1830, at Hilbersdorf, Kingdom of Saxony to former Prussian Army officer Leopold von Iwonski and his wife Marie (Kalinowska-Tshirski) von Iwonski. At age 15, he emigrated with his family to Texas with the Adelsverein settlers, disembarking at Galveston on December 18, 1845, from the Johann Detthard .

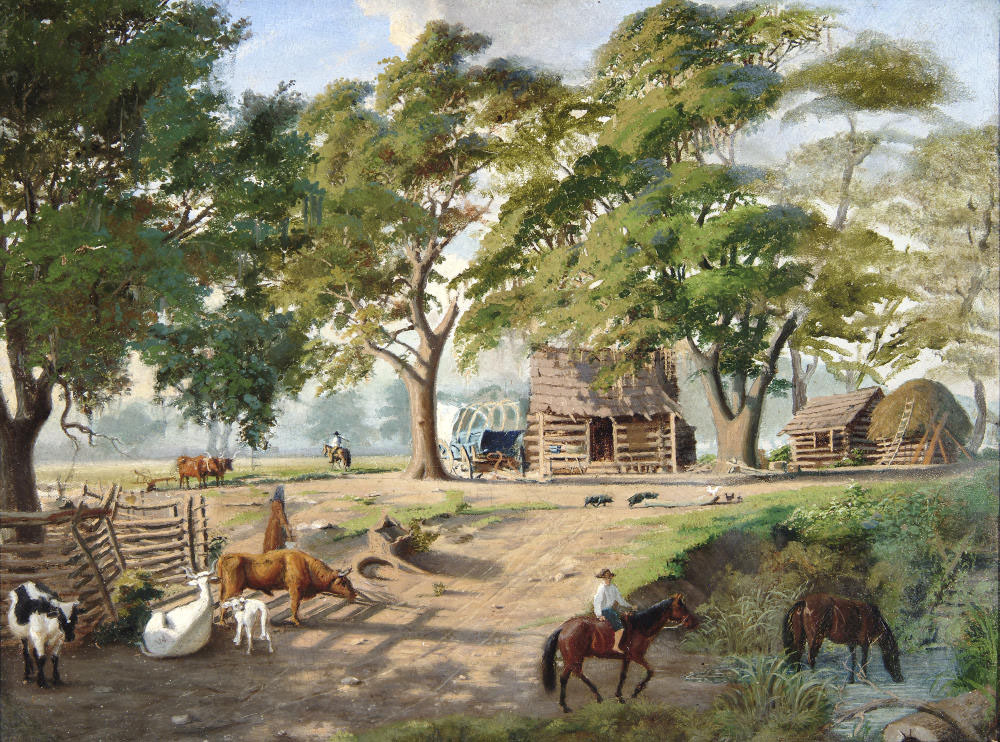
Log Cabin, New Braunfels

The family initially settled at Castell and Mill streets in New Braunfels. Leopold von Iwonski sold his 320-acre land grant and moved the family across the Guadalupe River from New Braunfels, to a settlement which came to be known as Neighborsville. The Iwonski home was on the Old San Antonio Road and doubled as a stage stop. Young Carl helped out on the family farm, and became a naturalized American citizen in 1854. His first known artistic effort was an 1853 sketch of the family's log cabin.

== New Braunfels ==
Iwonski's first known sketch books date to 1855, coinciding with his opening a studio in New Braunfels. His preferred media were pencil, ink, watercolor. He also made oil portraits of German settlers, and later became skilled as a sculptor. When Duke Paul Wilhelm of Württemberg visited New Braunfels on an 1855 visit, Iwonski made him a gift of six pencil sketches of his Texas creations. From 1855 to 1857, he made a series of sketches of the New Braunfels Amateur Theater.

== San Antonio ==
Iwonski moved to San Antonio in 1857 and in 1859 became associated with artist William DeRyee. Iwonski began making sketches of troops stationed in the south Texas area during the Civil War. His most famous was The Terry's Rangers. He also became a teacher at the Bickler German-English Academy. From 1866 to 1870, Iwonski ran a San Antonio photography studio with fellow artist Hermann Lungkwitz. In addition to his portraits, he began painting landscapes.

During Reconstruction, Carl von Iwonski became San Antonio city tax collector, and his father Leopold became Bexar County treasurer. Both father and son become radical leaders in the local Republican party, and Carl began to draw political cartoons. Leopold von Iwonski died in office on October 15, 1872.

Iwonski took a sabbatical in 1871 to study at the Berlin Academy of Art.

== Personal life and death ==
Carl G. von Iwonski never married. In 1873, he accompanied his widowed mother back to Germany and remained there the rest of his life. He died in Breslau on April 4, 1912.

== Selected works ==
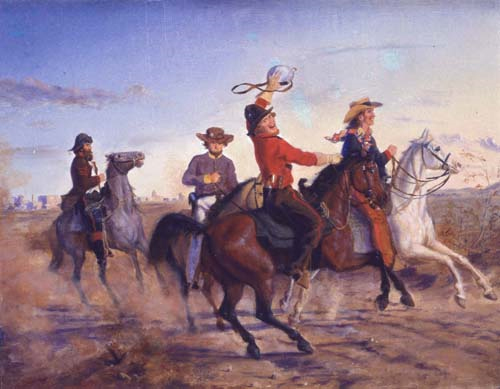
Samuel Maverick Jr with Terry's Texas Rangers

- Log Cabin, New Braunfels (Iwonski family home) (1853)
- Sketches of the New Braunfels Amateur Theater (1855–1857)
- New Braunfels Germania Gesangverein (1857)
- Alexander von Humboldt (1859)
- The Terry Rangers (1862)
- German general staff during the Franco-Prussian War (1871)

=== Portraits ===
- Sam Houston
- Delaware chief John Conner
- Manuel Yturri Sr
- José Fermín Cassiano
- John Baylor
- Johanna and Edward Steves
- Dorothea and Carl Hilmar Guenther
- Julius Schuetze
- Samuel Maverick
- Edmund Jackson Davis
