= Jacob Kuechler =

American politician (1823–1893)

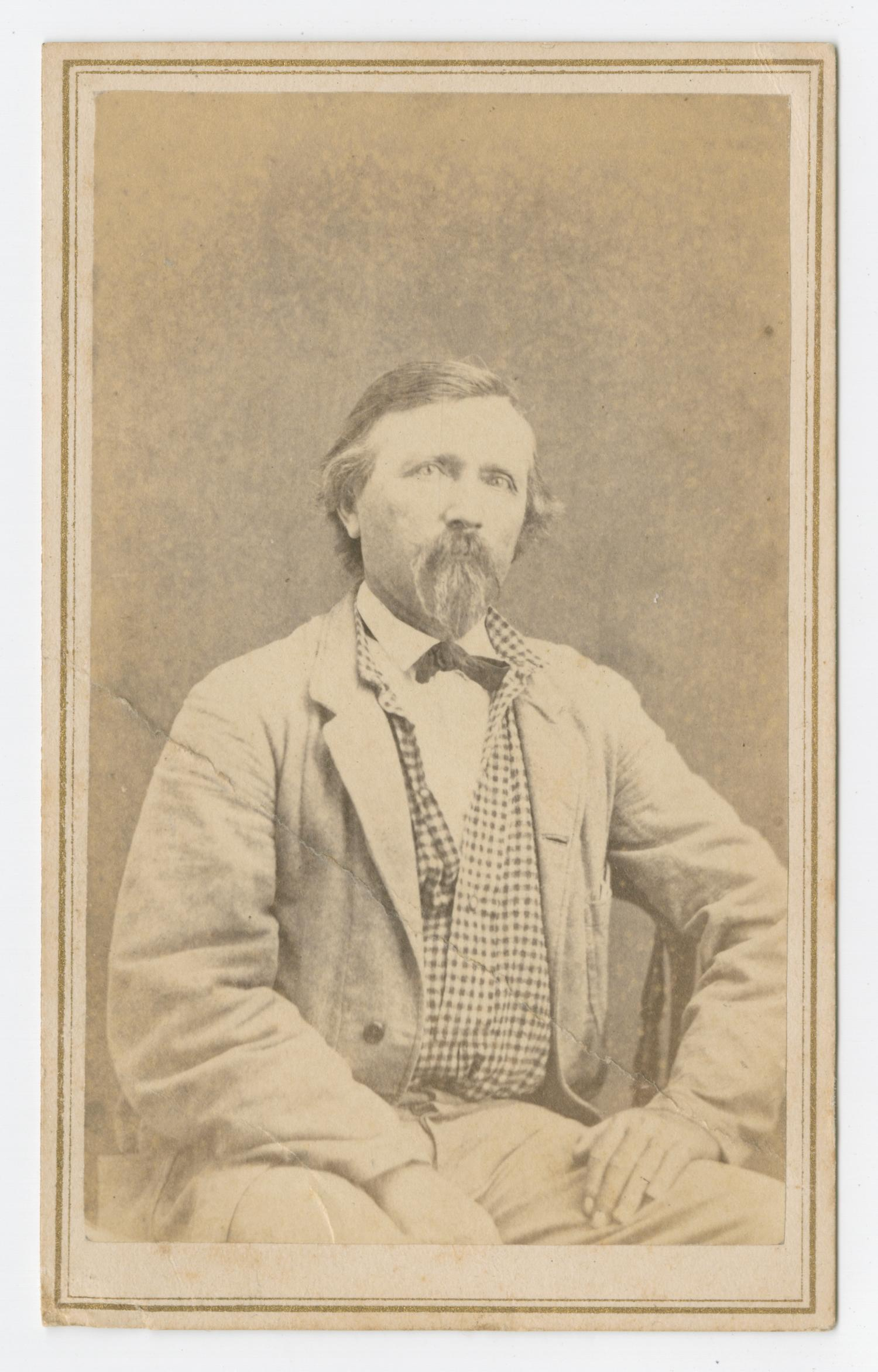

8th Land Commissioner of Texas
- In office January 19, 1870 – January 20, 1874
- Governor: Edmund J. Davis
- Preceded by: Joseph Spence
- Succeeded by: Johann J. Groos

Personal details
- Born: February 18, 1823 Hesse-Darmstadt
- Died: April 4, 1893 (aged 70) Austin, Texas, U.S.
- Resting place: Oakwood Cemetery
- Party: Republican
- Spouse: Marie Petri
- Children: 3
- Education: University of Giessen

Jacob Kuechler (February 18, 1823 – April 4, 1893) was a surveyor, conscientious objector during the American Civil War, and commissioner of the Texas General Land Office. Kuechler pioneered the science of dendrochronology to date natural events.

== Early life and education ==
Jacob Kuechler was born in Schoellenbach, Hesse-Darmstadt, on February 18, 1823; his father was Albrecht Kuechler, an engineering and forestry official. Jacob Kuechler graduated from the University of Giessen with degrees in civil engineering and forestry.

== Texas ==
Kuechler arrived in Galveston on July 4, 1847, on the ship St. Pauli from Hamburg. He was part of the Darmstadt free-thinker fraternity of intellectuals from the universities of Giessen and Heidelberg and the Gewerbeschule of Darmstadt. They founded the Fisher–Miller Land Grant community of Bettina, Texas, after John O. Meusebach negotiated the Meusebach–Comanche Treaty in 1847.

Bettina failed after the Adelsverein funding expired, and due to conflict of structure and authorities. The members dispersed to other communities, and Kuechler moved to Pedernales, Texas, to take up farming and ranching with the Lungkwitz and Petri families.

As Gillespie County surveyor, he pioneered dendrochronology at Fredericksburg during the drought of the late 1850s by comparing tree-ring sequences for dating natural events. The Kuechler study was published in 1859 as "Das Klima von Texas" in Gustav Schleicher's Texas Staats-Zeitung and 1861 in the Texas Almanac.

== Nueces massacre and exile ==
In 1861, Texas seceded from the Union, and joined the Confederate States of America. Upon recommendation by Samuel Maverick, Jacob Kuechler was commissioned as a captain by Sam Houston to enroll state militia troops in Gillespie County. Kuechler signed up only German Unionists in his frontier company, and was dismissed by Governor Francis R. Lubbock. In 1862, Confederate authorities imposed martial law on Central Texas. Jacob Kuechler served as a guide for 61 conscientious objectors attempting to flee to Mexico. In what later became known as the Nueces massacre, Confederate irregular James Duff and his Duff's Partisan Rangers pursued and overtook them at the Nueces River. Thirty-four were killed, some executed after being taken prisoner. Jacob Kuechler survived the battle. The cruelty shocked the people of Gillespie County. About 2000 people took to the hills to escape Duff's reign of terror. Kuechler remained in exile in Mexico, working as a surveyor until 1867.

== Return to Texas ==
Kuechler returned to Texas in 1867 during Reconstruction and entered the political arena, becoming a leading German voice in the Republican Party. He was appointed deputy collector of customs at San Antonio. Kuechler was elected a delegate to the state Constitutional Convention of 1868–69. He was elected commissioner of the Texas General Land Office in 1870, holding the position for the entire four years of the administration of Governor Edmund J. Davis. In 1873, he appointed Jacob Bickler as assistant draftsman and calculator. Kuechler's wife's brother-in-law Hermann Lungkwitz received an appointment for the Texas General Land Office, and Lungkwitz's daughter Martha Lungkwitz Bickler became a clerk with the office. Keuchler was the last Republican to be elected Texas Land Commissioner until the election of David Dewhurst in 1999.

He became a surveyor along the Devils River and the Pecos River for the International and Great Northern Railroad and the Gulf, Western Texas and Pacific Railroad. In 1878, he was appointed principal surveyor for the Texas and Pacific Railway.

== Personal life and death ==
Kuechler became an American citizen on October 10, 1853.

In May 1856, Kuechler married Marie Petri, sister of painter Friedrich Richard Petri. The couple had three sons. In 1887, the Petri family returned for a visit to Germany. Kuechler died in Austin on April 4, 1893, and is buried in Oakwood Cemetery.

Political offices
Preceded by Joseph Spence	Commissioner of the Texas General Land Office; January 19, 1870 – January 20, 1874	Succeeded by Johann J. Groos
