= William Frels =

German emigrant

William Frels co-founded the town of Frelsburg, Texas around 1837 with his brother John Frels. He immigrated to Texas from Germany in 1834. He spoke German, Spanish, and English when Texas came under Mexican and U.S. rule.
