= Louise Feltin =

Personal life
- Born: December 27, 1831 Alsace
- Died: February 1, 1905 (aged 73) Castroville
- Home town: Austin, Texas

Religious life
- Religion: Christianity
- Denomination: Catholic

Senior posting
- Post: Congregation of Divine Providence

Louise (Mother St. Andrew) Feltin (December 27, 1830 - February 1, 1905) was an American Roman Catholic sister from Alsatia and the founder of the Sisters of Divine Providence in Texas. She is the co-founder of the first Catholic school in Texas. Feltin's work in the parish schools "heavily influenced the course of parochial education" in Texas.

== Biography ==
Feltin's early education took place in the towns of Geispolsheim and La Walk. She joined the convent of St. Jean de Bassel when she was nineteen. Feltin taught in various schools in Krautergersheim, Epfig, Heilgenberg and Batzendorf as a young woman. Feltin was fluent in both French and German and was said to be a woman of "strong physique and will power."

Feltin was recruited to come to Texas by Bishop Claude Dubuis in 1866. Feltin was interested in coming to Texas in order to be a missionary and because she had heard reports about the state from her brother, Father Nicholas Feltin who worked in San Antonio and Austin. Feltin came to Austin with Sister Alphonse Boegler and together they established the first Catholic school in Texas. Afterwards, Dubuis sent Feltin to Castroville where she would start another permanent school.

Feltin arrived in Castroville along with Sister Agnes Wolf on September 9, 1868. By October, they had established a small school in the church. A building for the Sisters of Divine Providence was established in Castroville and Feltin recruited sisters from the mother house of Saint Jean-de-Bassel. Feltin worked between 1868 and 1870 to set up a proper school for children in the Castroville area and had set up a tuition system for students who could not afford school. By 1871, she had opened a school in New Braunfels and sent sisters to open a school in Frelsburg. When Texas became a state in 1870 and when public education standards were passed in 1871, Felton kept pace with the standards in her own schools. She sent her sisters to continuing education workshops and studied available standardized schoolbooks.

In 1872, a superior priest, Father Edward Sorin of the Holy Cross in Austin, wanted to take over a school which was under the jurisdiction of the Sisters of Divine Providence. Feltin's refusal to give the property to Sorin was the beginning of her personal trouble with male members of the church in Texas. Feltin, while asserting her right to the school in Austin was unable to provide sisters to staff the school, however, neither did Sorin have people readily available to teach. In order to solve the problem, Feltin's brother, Nicholas, taught the boys and another sister, St. Joseph, was able to teach the girls. Both siblings thought the problem was solved until Texas was divided by the Catholic diocese in December 1872 into separate sections overseen by different Bishops. Father Feltin left Austin and Mother Feltin was forced to withdraw her sisters from Austin as well.

In 1873, when Dubuis traveled through Castroville, Feltin requested permission to build a convent, which he gave, along with a monetary and land donation for the building. The convent was nearly complete by August 25, 1873, and was celebrated and invested by the church. In 1876, a new Texas School Law was established which helped the sisters provide education to everyone, regardless of economic situation. Feltin continued to grow her schools through 1878. In 1878, Feltin returned to St. Jean-de-Bassel to recruit more sisters to come to Texas as teachers.

Feltin eventually felt the full wrath of the bishops and priests in 1886. Four priests claimed to Bishop John C. Néraz that Feltin was spreading falsehoods, fear and gossip about the priests among her sisters. Father Henry Pfefferkorn, one of the four complainants, petitioned Néraz to remove Feltin in order to preserve his, and other priests' "personal honor," as Feltin was accused of "scandal-mongering." These priests wanted more control over Feltin's schools continued to insist that Feltin be removed as Mother Superior of the Sisters of Divine Providence. Using religious leverage, they also refused to hear confessions of any of her sisters until she was removed. Néraz complied and removed Feltin from her office. He also "hounded her for years, disciplined other nuns she had befriended, suspended her right to the sacraments" and would not allow any Catholic order to provide her shelter. He also had her personal papers removed from community records. Feltin resigned from service in 1886 that same year and then moved to California in 1887 to live with her nieces and nephews. She was essentially forced into exile for a total of eighteen years because of Néraz's efforts.

When Néraz died, she went back into religious service and returned to Castroville. She died there in 1905. A historic fictional account of her life, The Tattered Heart (ISBN 978-0595436392), was written in 2007 by Mary Diane Langford.
