= Hermann Lungkwitz =

German-American painter

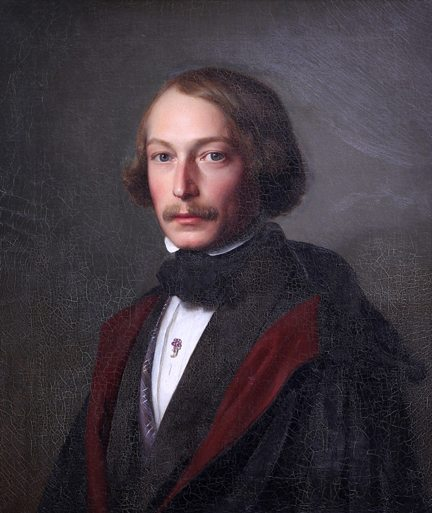
- Hermann Lungkwitz: by Friedrich Richard Petri, ca. 1851, oil (23.75 x 20 in.), collection of the Governor’s Mansion, Austin, Texas, USA
- Born: Karl Friedrich Hermann Lungkwitz; March 14, 1813; Halle, Prussia (now Saxony-Anhalt)
- Died: February 10, 1891 (aged 77); Austin, Texas
- Education: Dresden Academy of Fine Arts
- Known for: Romantic landscapes Photography

Hermann Lungkwitz (March 14, 1813 – February 10, 1891) was a 19th-century German-born Texas romantic landscape artist and photographer whose work became the first pictorial record of the Texas Hill Country.

== Early life ==
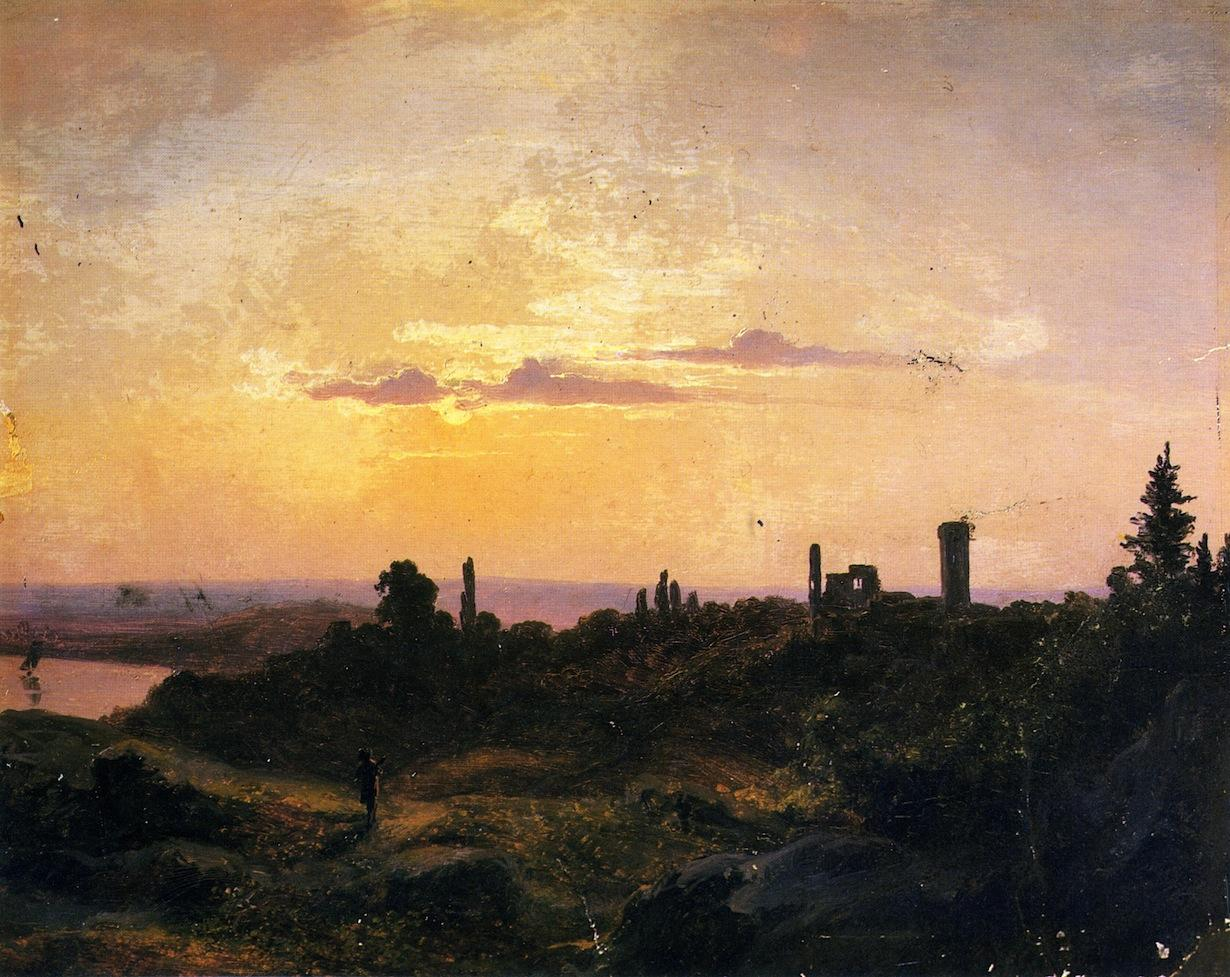
Sunset in Saxony, oil on canvas, (date, dimensions and collection unknown).

Karl Friedrich Hermann Lungkwitz was born on March 14, 1813, in Halle, Kingdom of Prussia to hosiery manufacturer Johann Gottfried Lungkwitz and his wife Friederike Wilhelmine (Hecht) Lungkwitz.

Lungkwitz was enrolled at the Dresden Academy of Fine Arts from 1840 to 1843 and received his artistic training under the tutelage of Adrian Ludwig Richter. After receiving an academy certificate of achievement in 1843 for his sketch of the Elbe River, Lungkwitz spent the next three years honing his artistic skills in Salzkammergut and the Northern Limestone Alps in Bavaria.

Lungkwitz and his brother-in-law Friedrich Richard Petri joined other students in the failed 1849 May Uprising in Dresden, an event at the tail end of the Revolutions of 1848 resulting from the refusal of Frederick Augustus II to recognize a constitutional monarchy.

== Texas ==
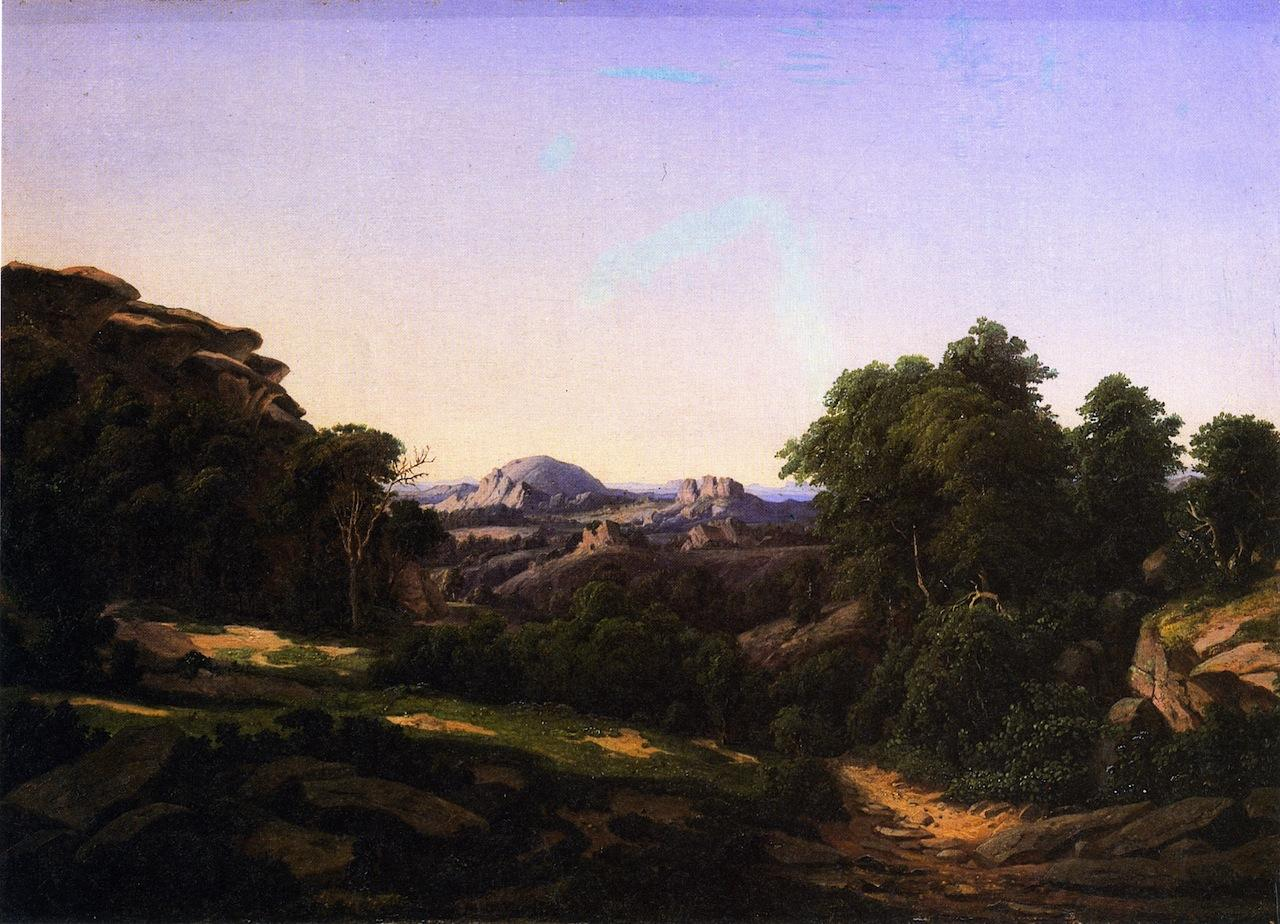
Enchanted Rock near Fredericksburg, 1864, oil on canvas, (dimensions and collection unknown).

In 1850, the Lungkwitz and Petri families emigrated to the United States, landing first in New York City. They migrated to Wheeling, West Virginia, but decided on the destination of Texas in 1851.

In 1852, the two families bought a 320-acre farm for $400 in the settlement of Pedernales, Texas, near Fredericksburg and took up farming and cattle ranching. The families remained there until 1864, although Petri drowned in the Pedernales River in 1857. Lungkwitz continued to create paintings of the Texas Hill Country, one of his favorite subjects being Enchanted Rock, of which he painted at least six landscapes:

I wanted to penetrate more into the interior of the granite mountains. I found and painted a few charming views of the Enchanted Rock and the neighboring mountain ridges from my position on a very precipitous peak called Rauhenkopf. To reach my position of observation, I had to hike one and a half miles every day through mesquite brush and into rocky ground without any path ... Within a radius of six miles, one cannot find any human habitation—one can only camp out. The area at Crabapple near Grebe's and Max's farm is wildly romantic with many beautiful views.

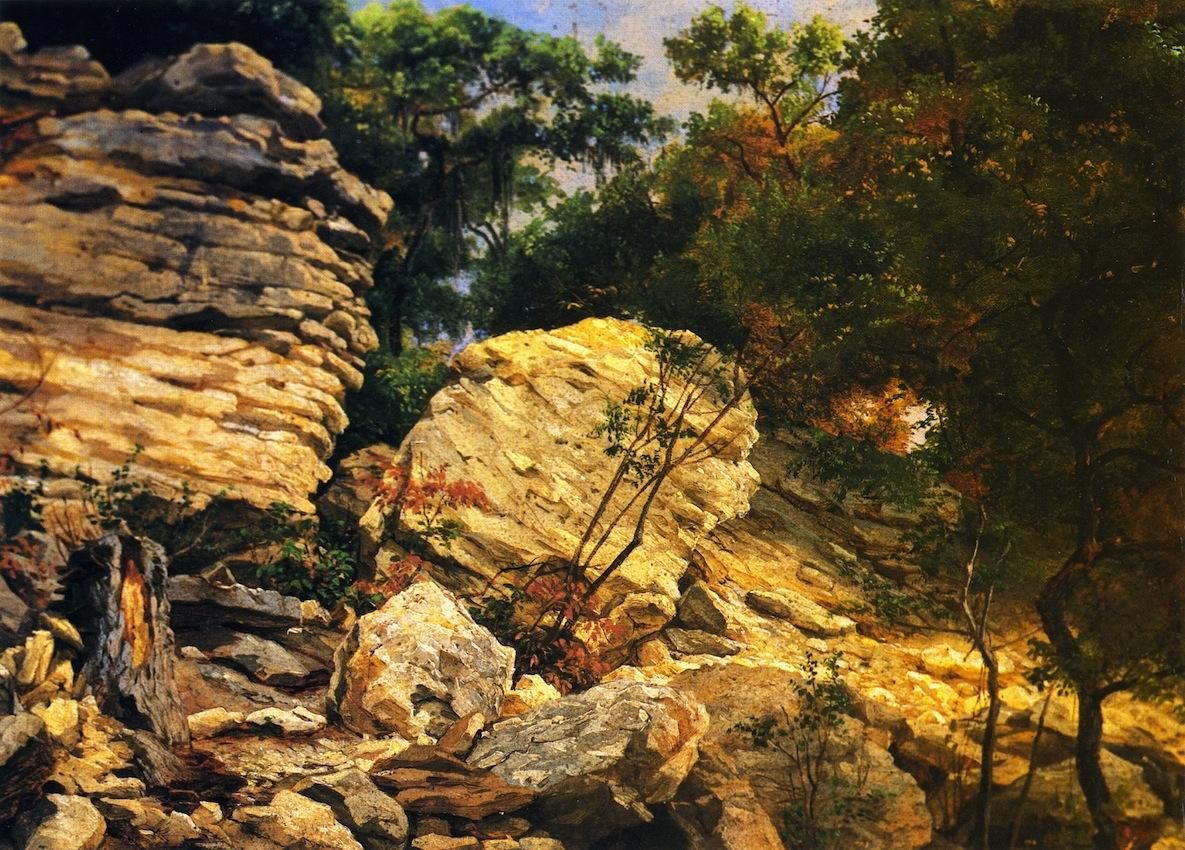
"Split Rock on Shoal Creek", oil on academy board by Hermann Lungkwitz.

The artist created in great detail in both pencil drawings and paintings. In addition to Gillespie County vistas, his Texas subjects were the German settlements of New Braunfels and Sisterdale, the Hamilton Pool and West Cave at Round Mountain, Marble Falls, and areas around Austin and San Antonio. From 1866–1870, Lungkwitz ran a San Antonio photography studio with Carl G. von Iwonski.

In 1870 he accepted an $1,800 a year appointment in Austin as photographer for the Texas General Land Office under commissioner Jacob Kuechler, brother-in-law to Friedrich Richard Petri. He held the position for the entirety of the administration of Governor Edmund J. Davis. His daughter Martha Lungkwitz Bickler also received an appointment as Texas General Land Office clerk in an era where few women worked in state government. In 1877, Martha's husband Jacob Bickler founded the Texas German and English Academy in Austin, where Lungkwitz taught drawing and painting. Bickler became superintendent of Galveston public schools in 1887, and also founded the Bickler Academy in Austin in 1892. Lungkwitz gave private lessons at both Austin and Galveston whenever he visited the Bicklers. In Blanco County, Lungkwitz assisted his daughter Eva and her husband Richard Klappenbach on their sheep ranch near Johnson City.

== Personal life and death ==
Lungkwitz married Elisabeth "Elise" Petri, sister of Friedrich Richard Petri. The couple had six children. Elisabeth died in 1880 and is buried at the Oakwood Cemetery in Austin, Texas. Lungkwitz died in Austin on February 10, 1891, and is buried next to his wife.

Lungkwitz is the great-great-grandfather of American photographer Rocky Schenck.

== Hermann Lungkwitz gallery ==
All works are oil paintings. Dates, dimensions, and collections unknown if not provided

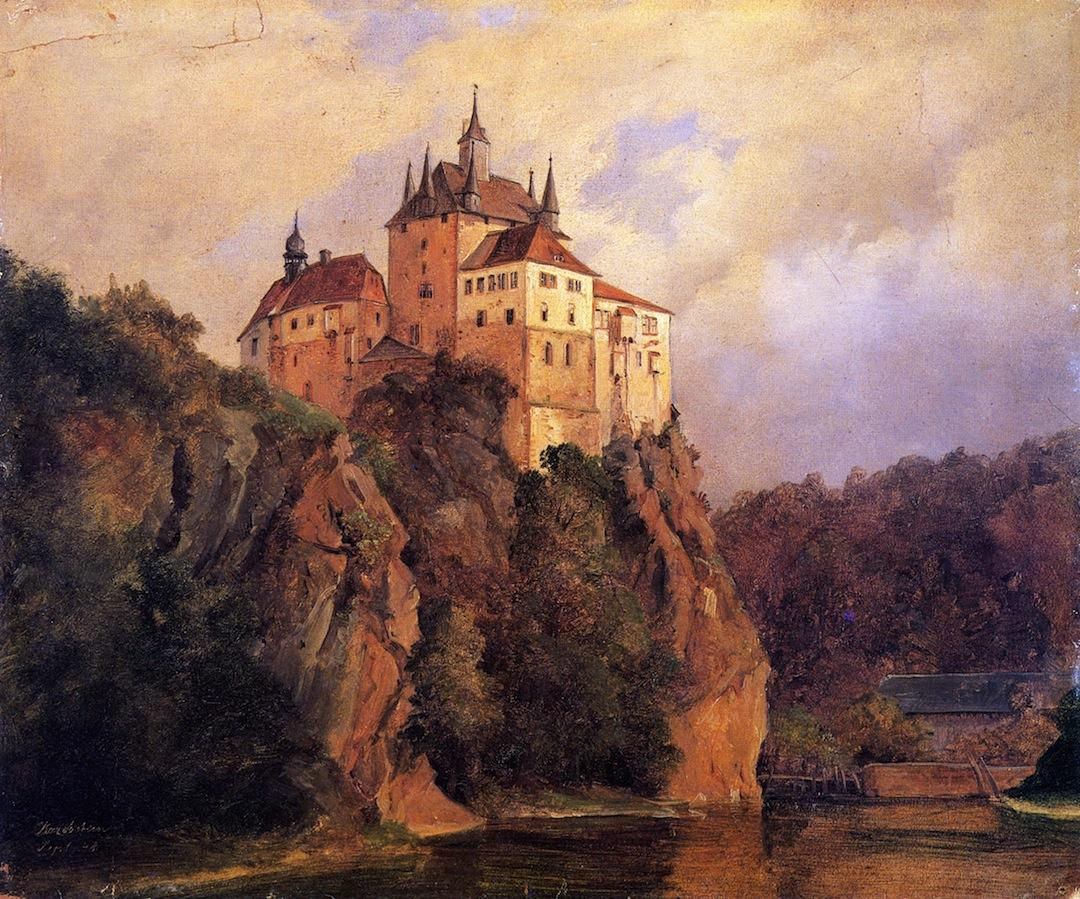
Kriebstein Castle in Saxony Germany, 1848

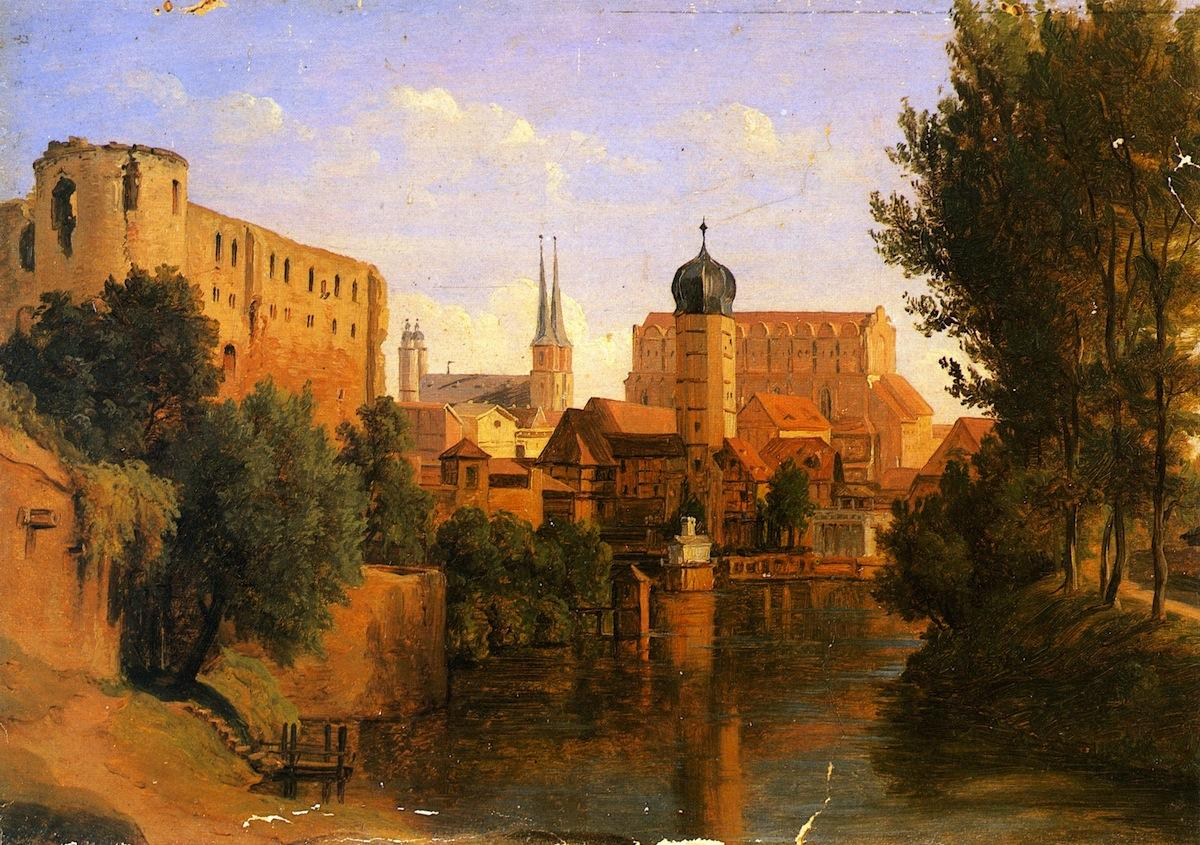
Halle an der Saale

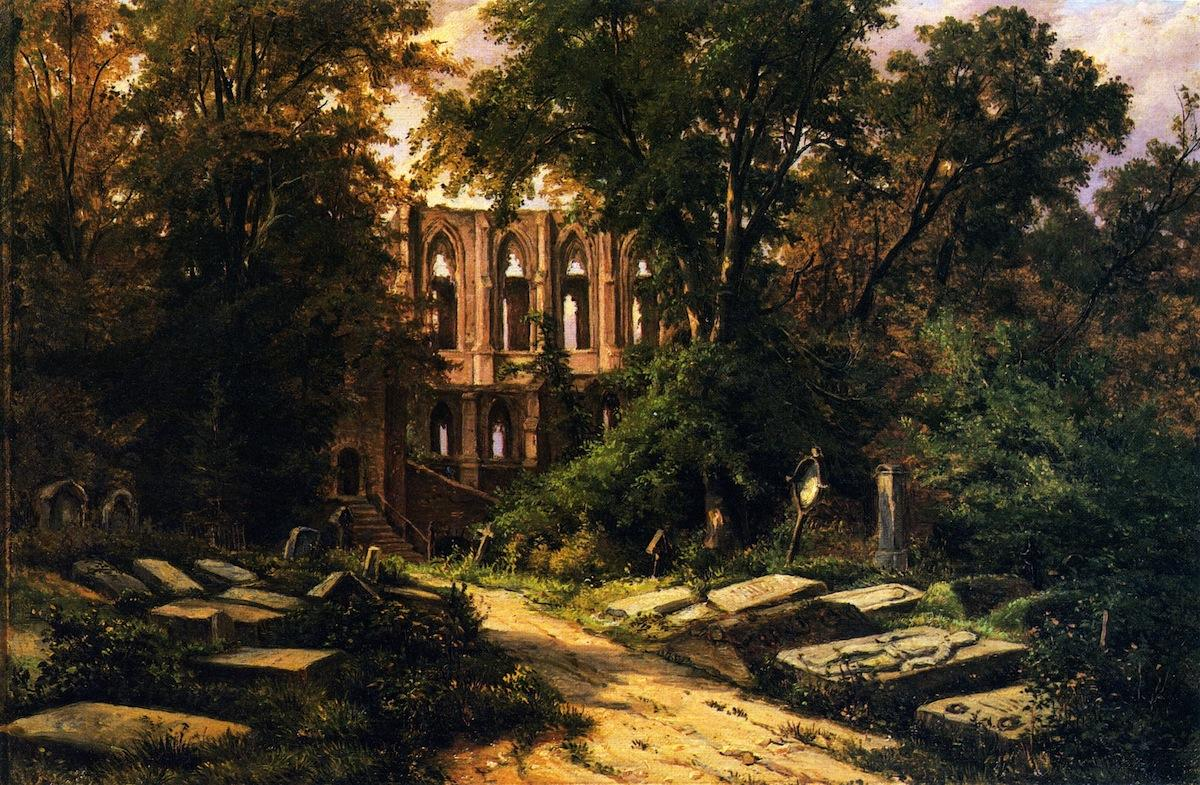
Cemetery by a Ruined Gothic Church

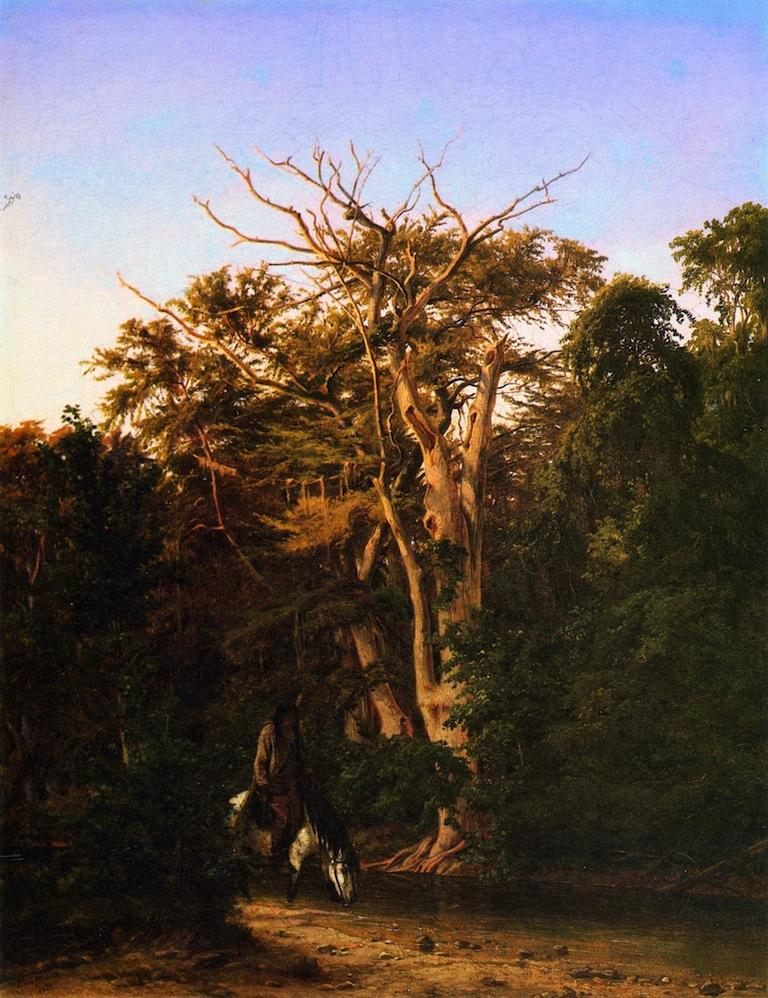
The Old Pinta Crossing on the Guadalupe, ca. 1850s

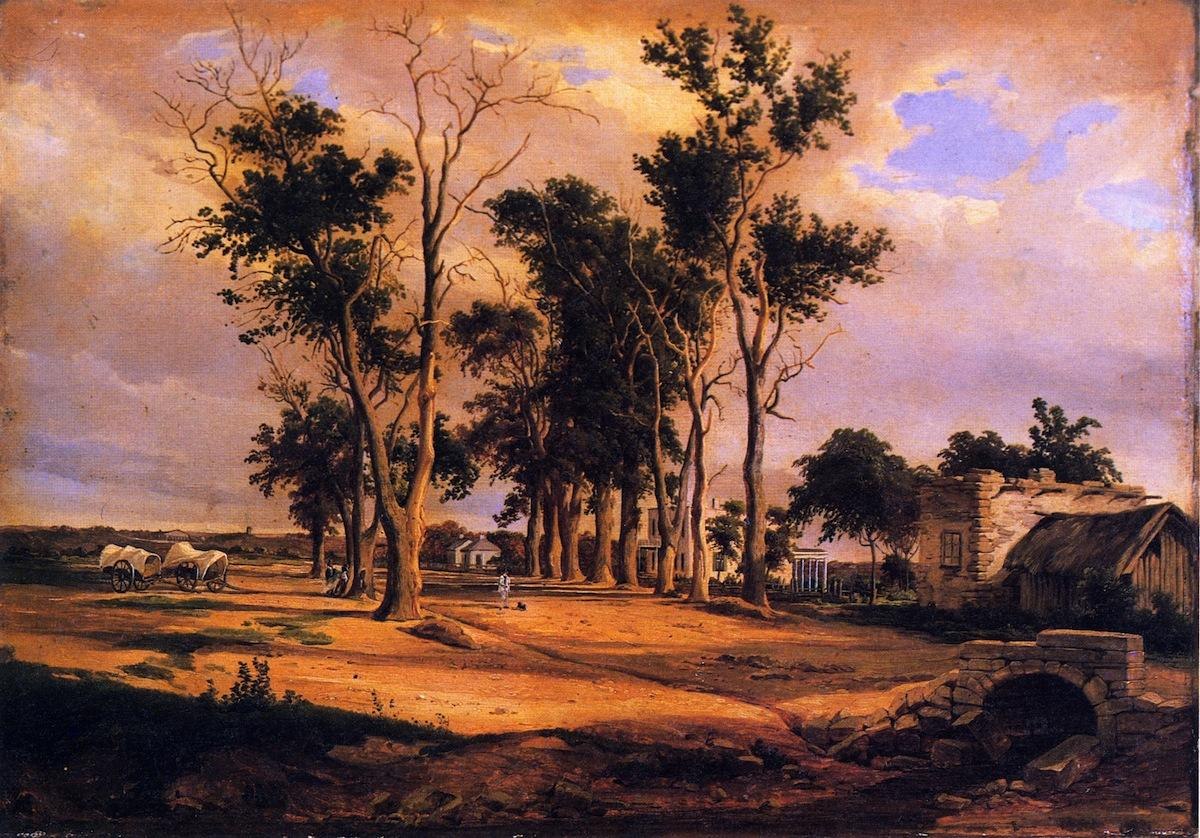
Alameda

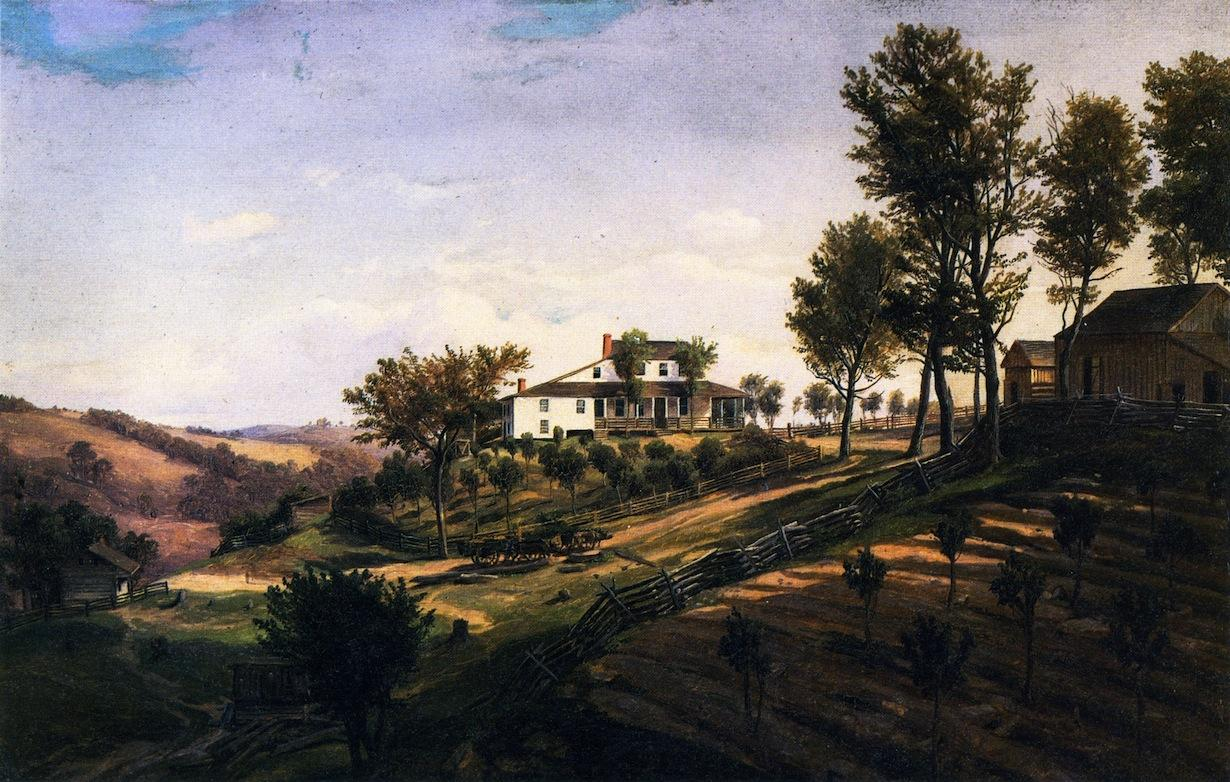
Hubbard Farm of Dana on Chapline Hill, 1851

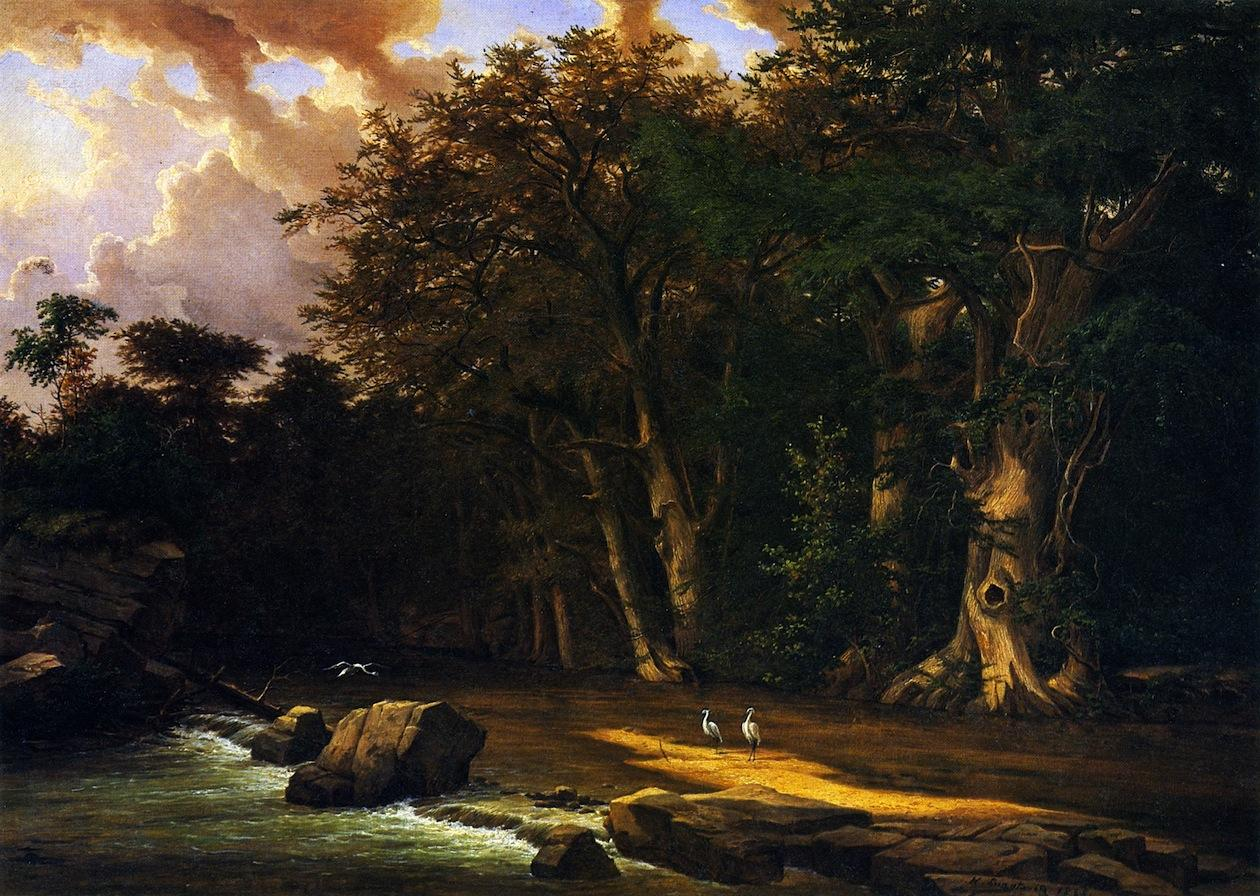
Herons on the Pedernales River, 1855

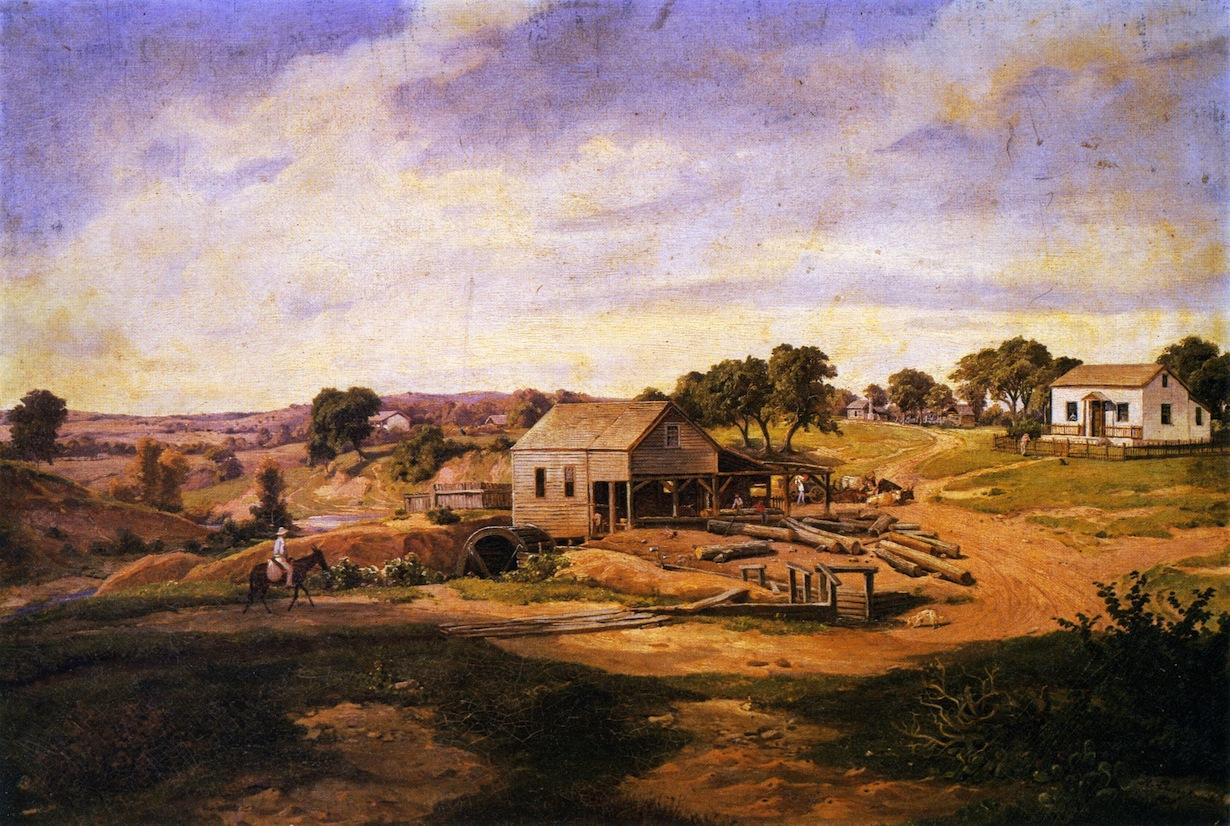
Guenther's Mill on Live Oak Creek, 1855

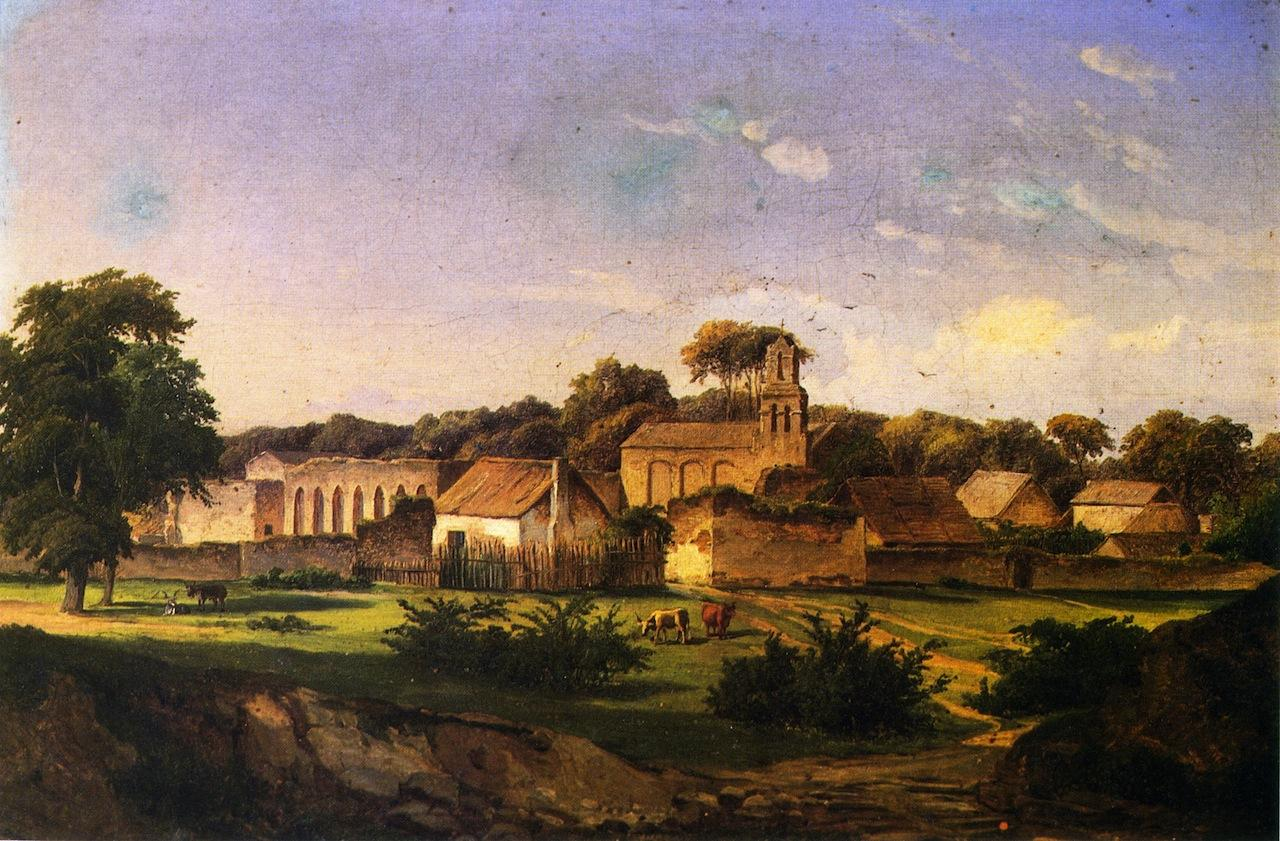
Mission San Juan de Capistrano, 1856

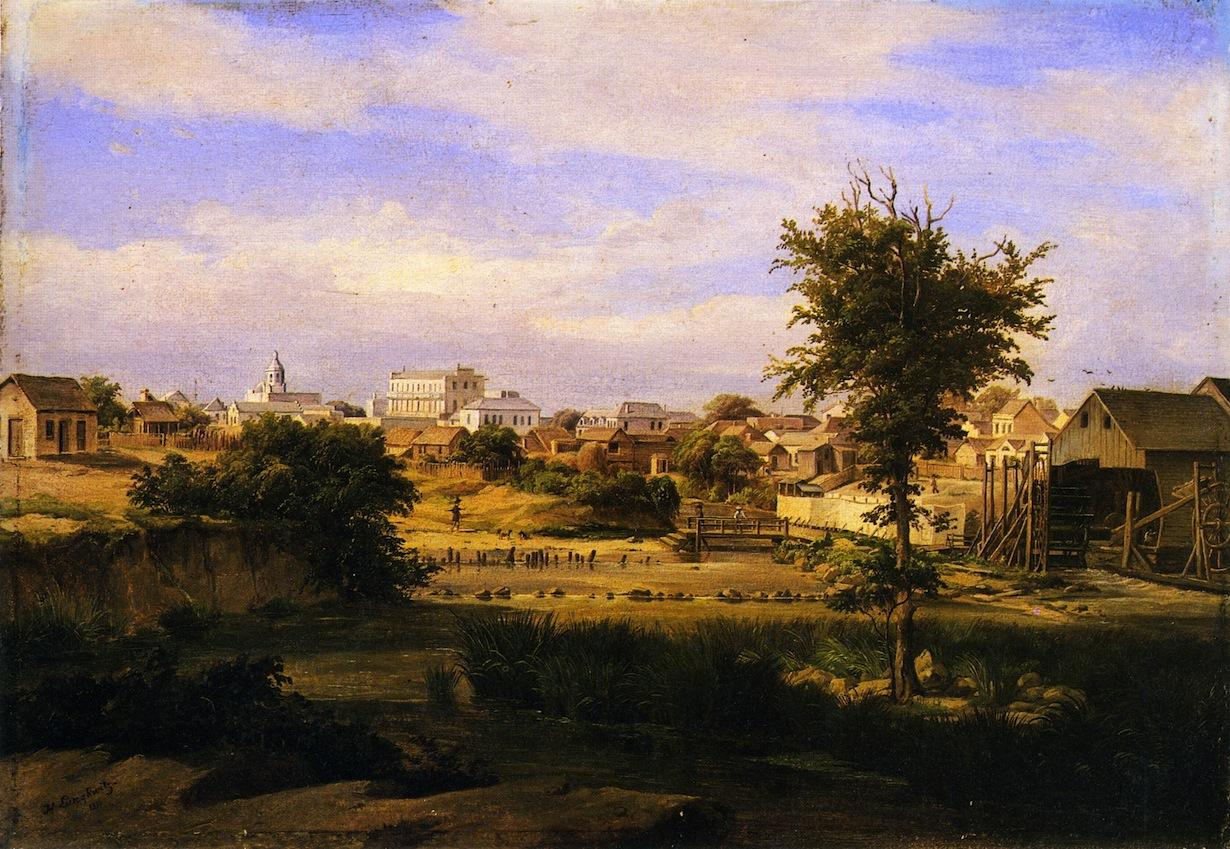
Lewis Grist Mill, 1856

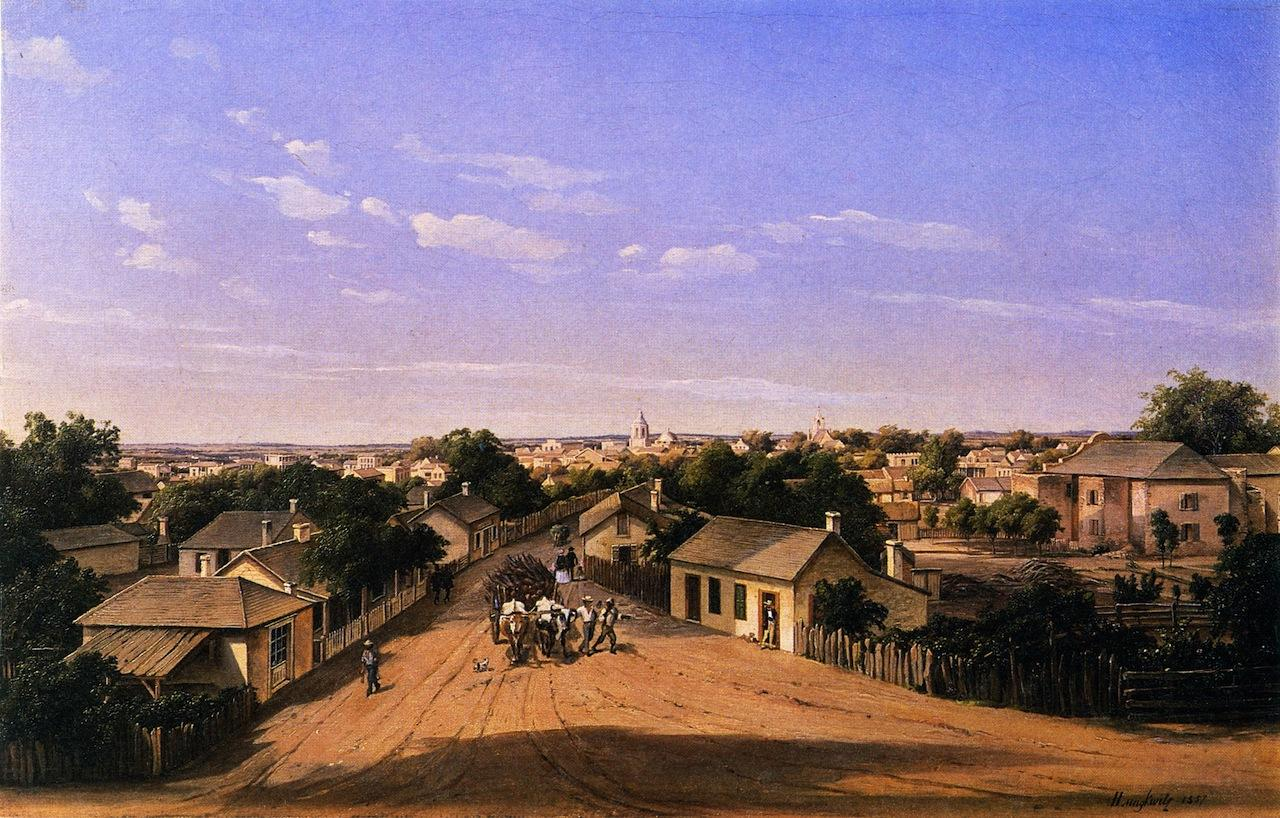
Crockett Street Looking West, San Antonio de Bexar, 1857

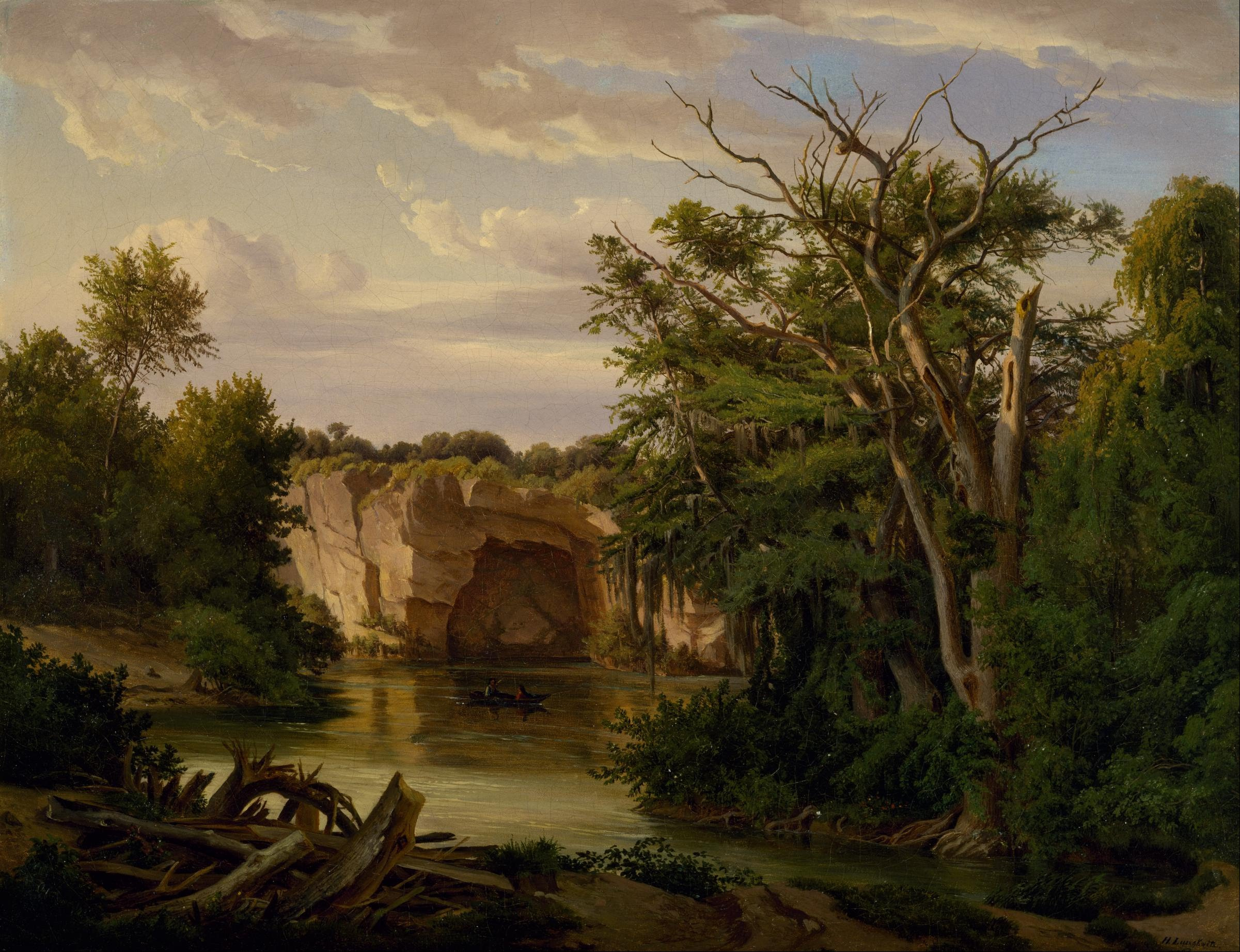
Hill Country Landscape, 1862, (46.7 x 60.5 cm.), Museum of Fine Arts, Houston

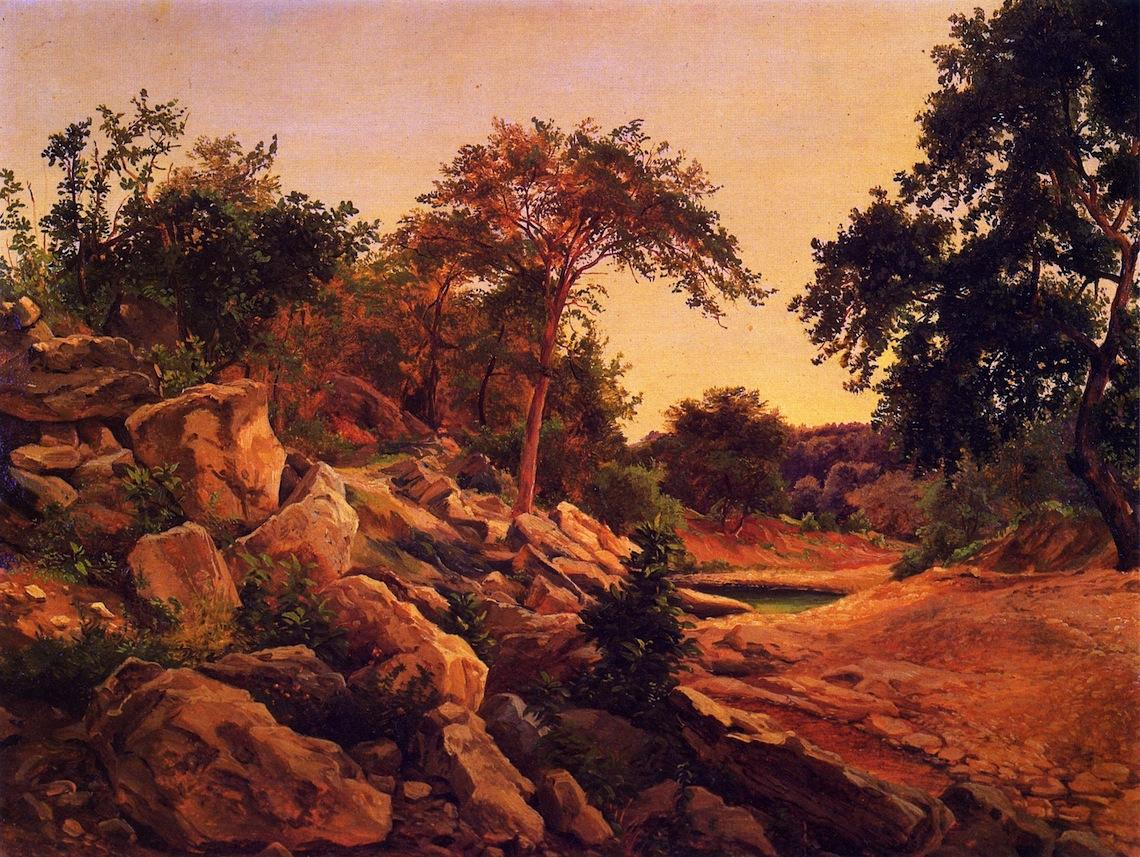
On Shoal Creek, Austin

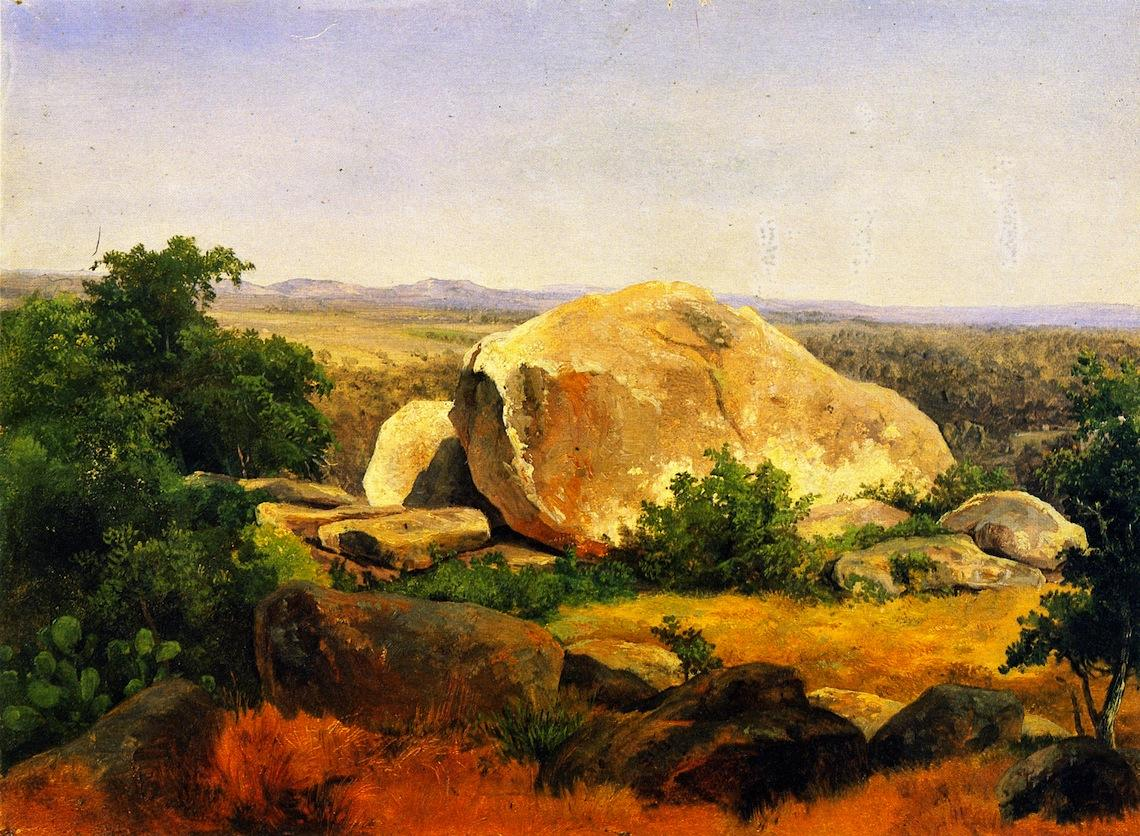
Yellow Boulders on Bear Mountain

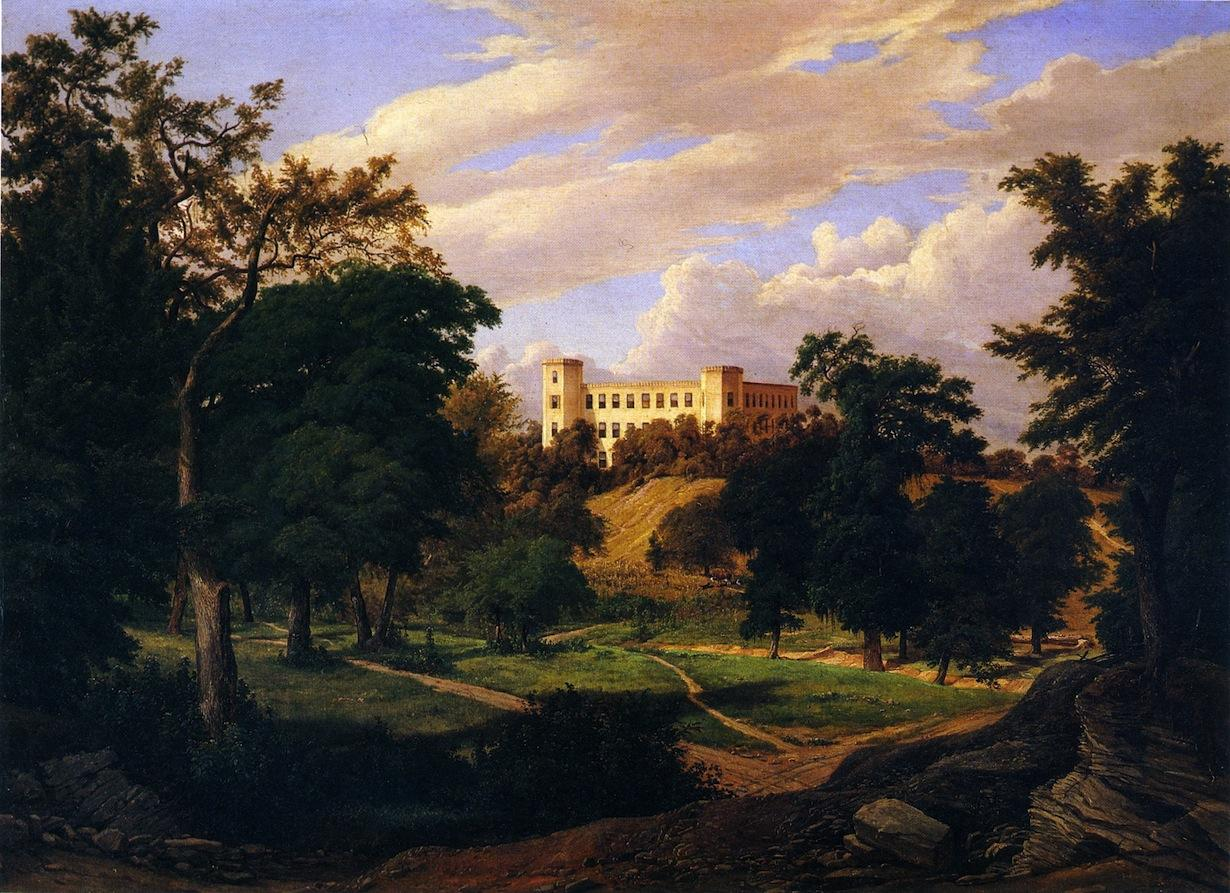
Texas Military Institute, Austin, 1874

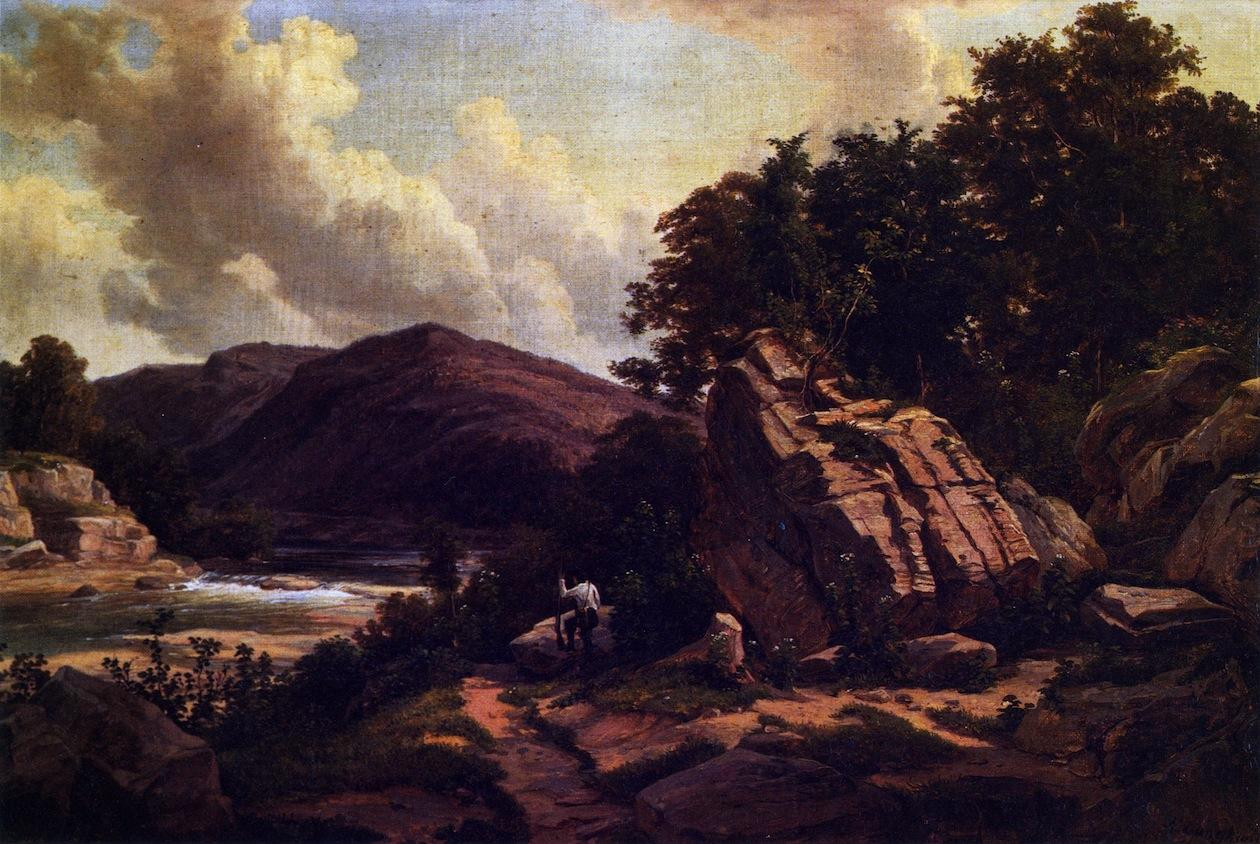
Falls of the Colorado, Austin, 1875

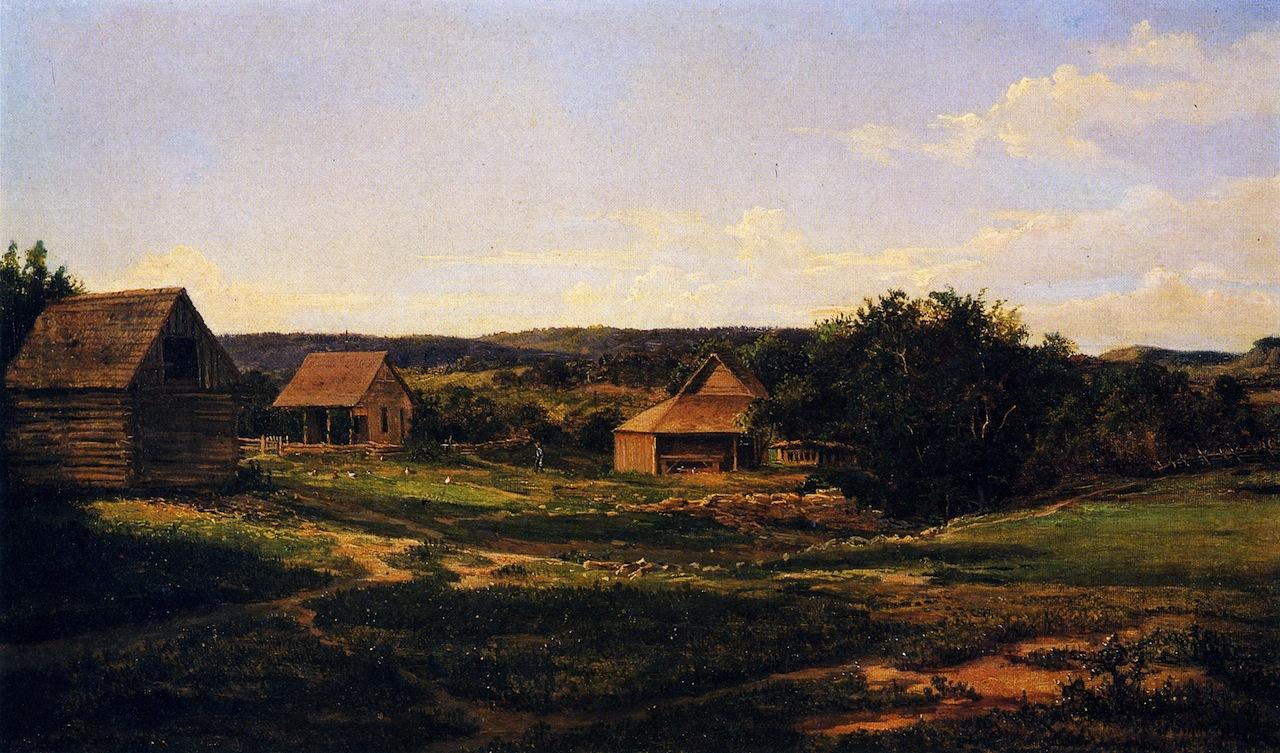
August Schroeter Ranch on the Colorado River, 1882

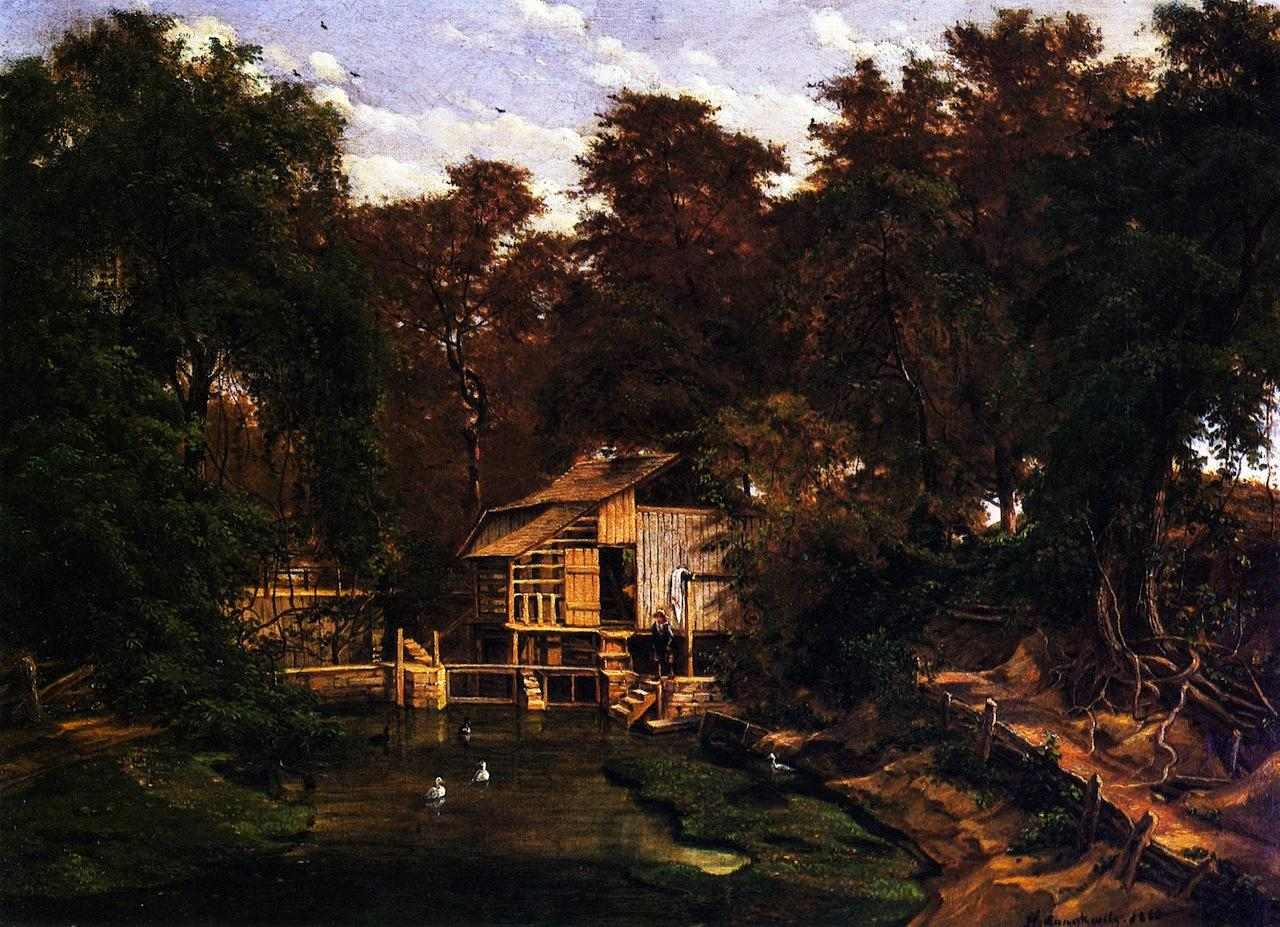
Paggi's Mill on Barton Creek, 1885

== Selected works ==
- Sunset in Saxony (1846)
- Old Pinta Crossing the Guadalupe (1857)
- Crockett Street Looking West (1857)
- Guadalupe River Landscape (1862)
- Enchanted Rock, Near Fredericksburg (1864)
- Texas Military Institute (1874)
- Taylor's Lime Kiln (1875)
- Paggi's Mill on Barton Creek, Austin (1876)
