= Friedrich Richard Petri =

German-American painter

- Born: Friedrich Richard Petri; July 31, 1824; Dresden, Kingdom of Saxony
- Died: Winter 1857 (age 33); Pedernales, Texas
- Education: Dresden Academy of Fine Arts
- Known for: Drawings; Watercolors

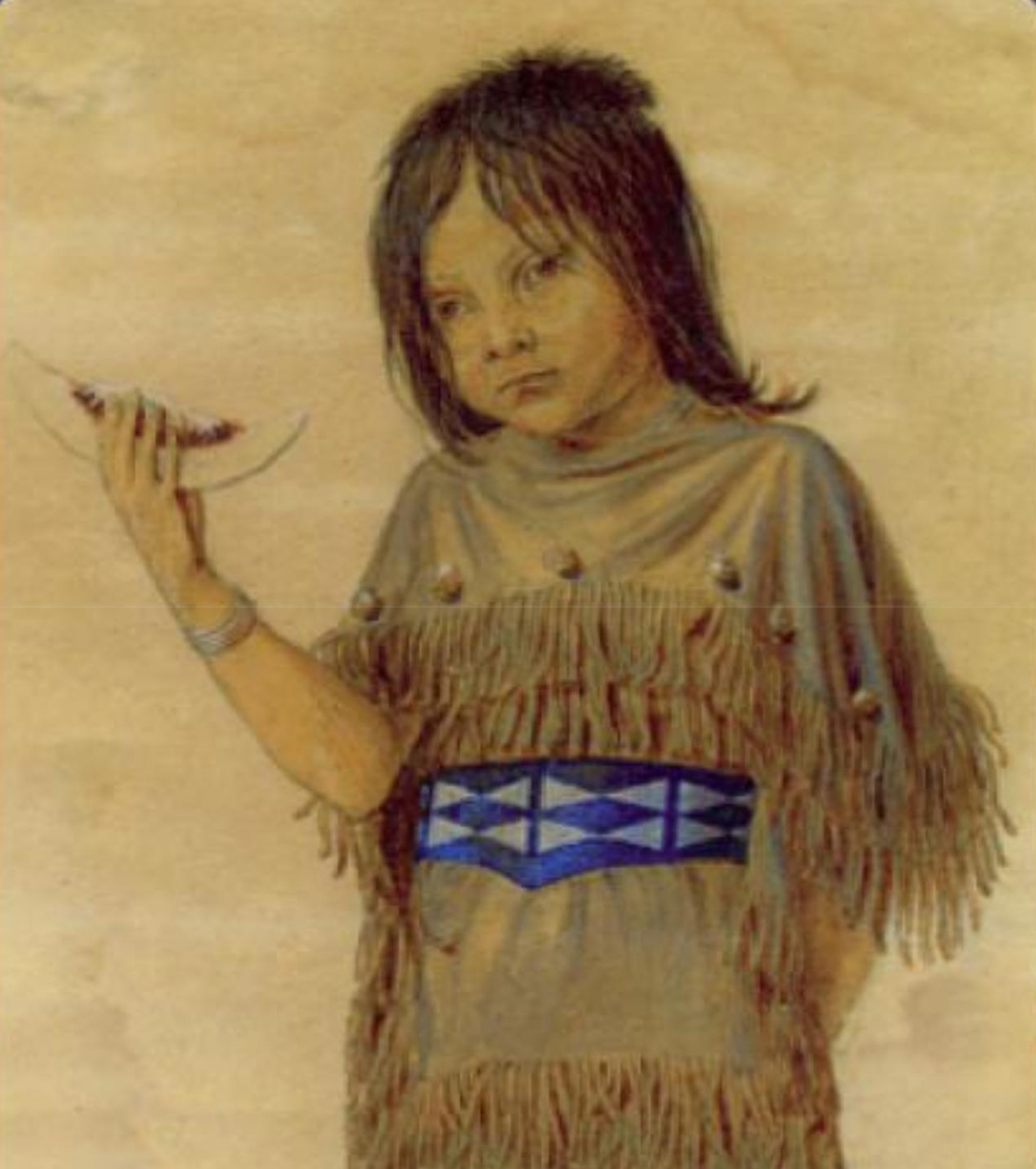
Plains Indian Girl with Melon

Friedrich Richard Petri (1824–1857) was a German-born Texas painter whose works recorded life in the original German immigrant settlements, and portrayed Native American tribes in family settings.

== Early life ==
Friedrich Richard Petri was born on July 31, 1824, in Dresden, Kingdom of Saxony to master shoemaker Heinrich Petri and his wife Juliane Dorothea (Weise) Petri.

At age fourteen, Petri was enrolled at the Dresden Academy of Fine Arts where he would remain for eleven years under the tutelage and guidance of Adrian Ludwig Richter and Julius Hübner. Petri won six awards and a scholarship to a further education in Italy, upon completion of which he was to return to the Dresden institution as an instructor. Petri was unable to accept the offer due to physical frailty. Hermann Lungkwitz, who married Petri's sister Elisabeth, befriended Petri while at the Dresden academy. Petri and Lungkwitz joined other students in the failed 1849 May Uprising in Dresden, an event at the tail end of the Revolutions of 1848 resulting from the refusal of Frederick Augustus II to recognize a constitutional monarchy.

== Texas ==
In 1850, the Lungkwitz and Petri families emigrated to the United States, landing first in New York City. They migrated to Wheeling, Virginia, but decided on the destination of Texas in 1851. Their journey took them by ship to New Orleans and Indianola, and then riding an oxcart to New Braunfels. In 1852, the two families bought a 320-acre farm for $400 in the settlement of Pedernales, Texas near Fredericksburg and took up farming and cattle ranching. Future Texas politician Jacob Kuechler married Petri's sister Marie in 1856, and became a part of the family business. Like many German immigrants to the American South, the Lungkwitz and Petri families chose not to own slaves but worked their farms themselves.

Petri's health remained frail for the duration of his life, but he continued his pencil sketches and watercolor paintings. His work reflects a fascination with the casual amicability between German settlers and local tribes of Delaware, Shawnee, Penateka Comanche and Lipan Apache, with meticulous attention to physical appearance, attire and lifestyle .

== Death ==
Petri drowned in the Pedernales River during the winter of 1857, and is buried in the family cemetery in Gillespie County, Texas.

== Notable works ==
- Self Portrait
- Plains Indian with Shield
- Plains Indian Warrior in Blue
- Mounted Plains Indian with Lance
- Indian Woman on Saddled Mule
- Indian Watering Pony
- Bartering with an Indian
- The Pioneer Cowpen
- Going Visiting
- Fort Martin Scott (unfinished) 1853 gathering of Lipan Apaches, interpreters, soldiers and settlers.

== Sources ==
- Newcomb, William Wilmon; Petri, Friedrich Richard; Carnahan, Mary S; Texas Memorial Museum (1978). German Artist on the Texas Frontier: Friedrich Richard Petri. University of Texas Press. ISBN 978-0-292-72717-5.
