= Temple =

Structure reserved for religious or spiritual activities

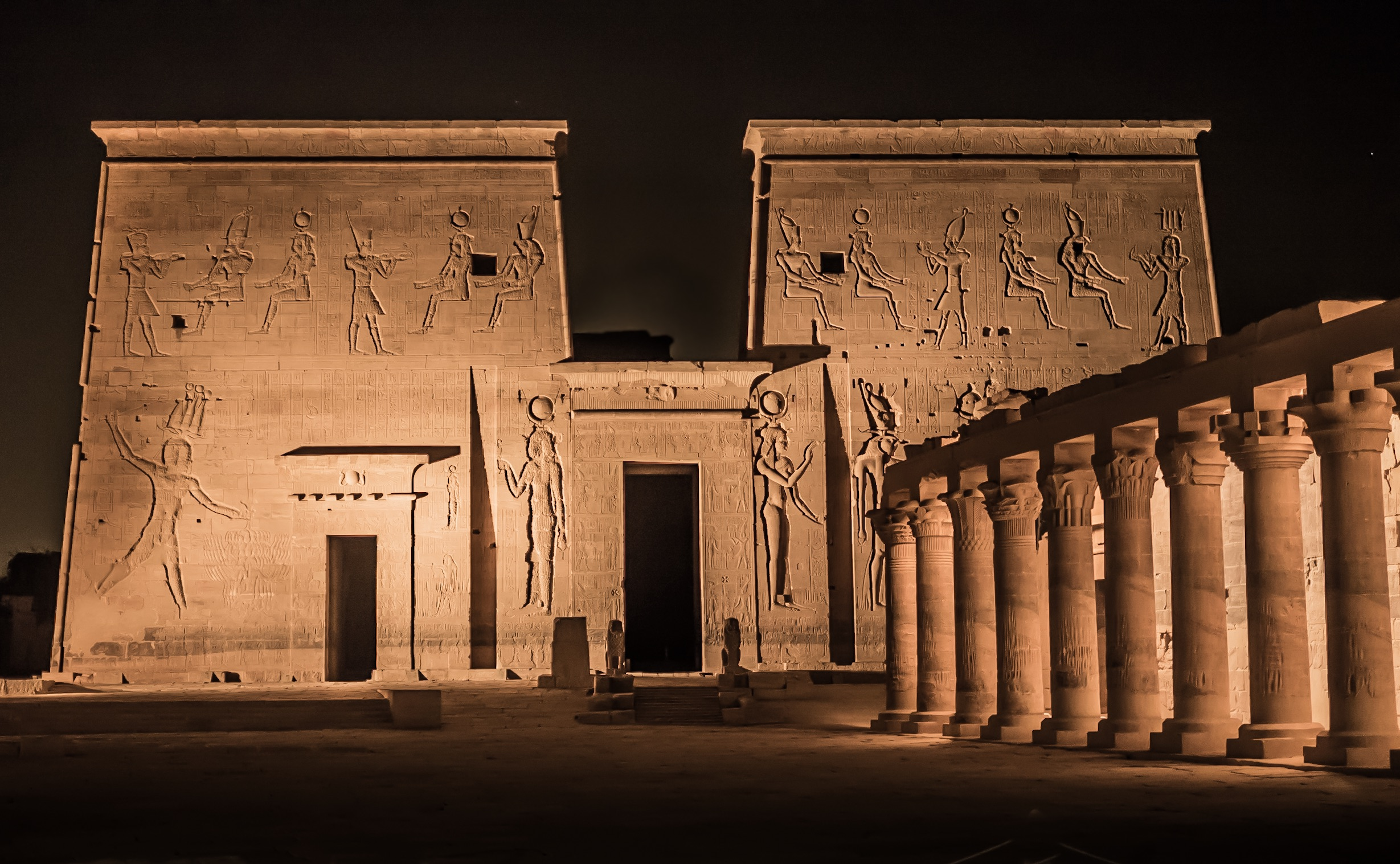
Egyptian temple of Philae, Aswan, Egypt, constructed in 6th century BC.

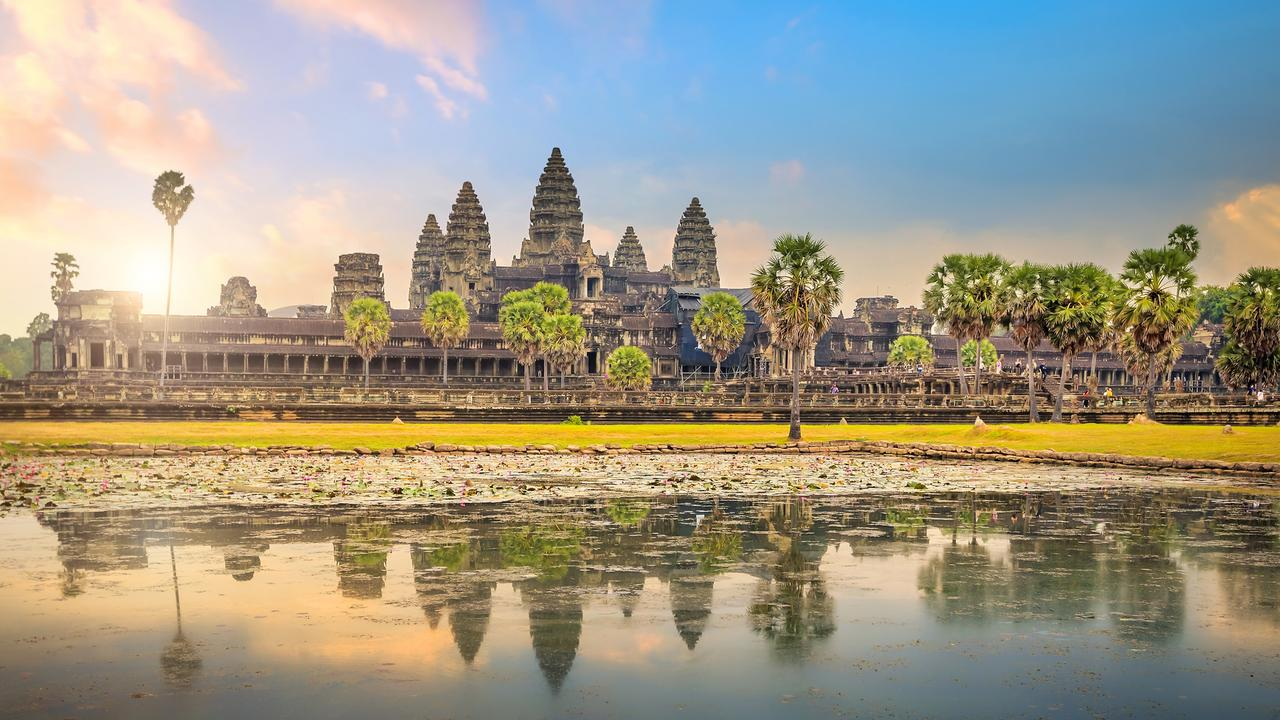
The 12th-century Angkor Wat temple complex in Cambodia is the largest religious structure in the world and is dedicated to the Hindu deity Vishnu.

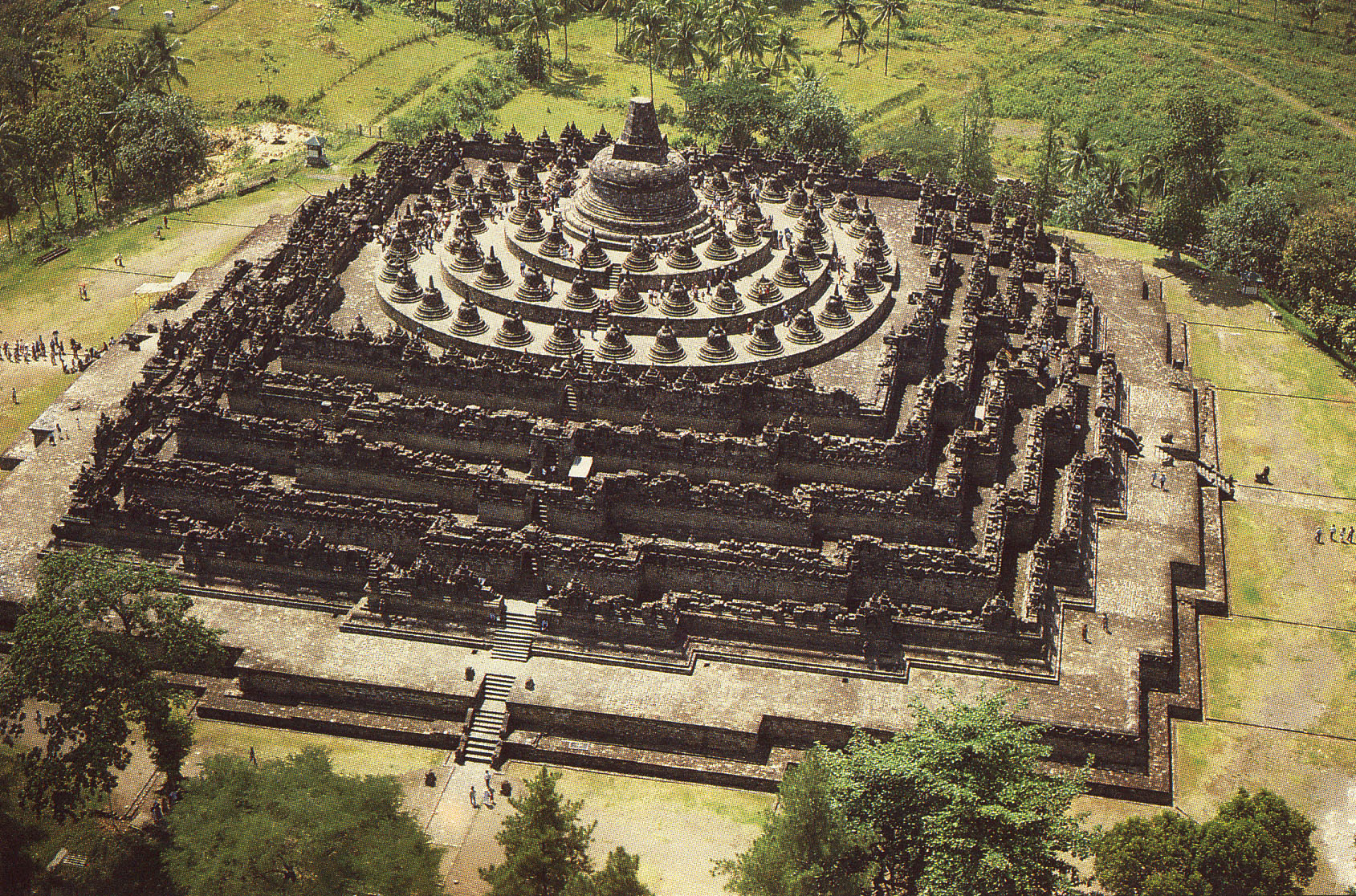
Borobudur temple, the largest Buddhist temple in the world, located in Central Java, Indonesia.

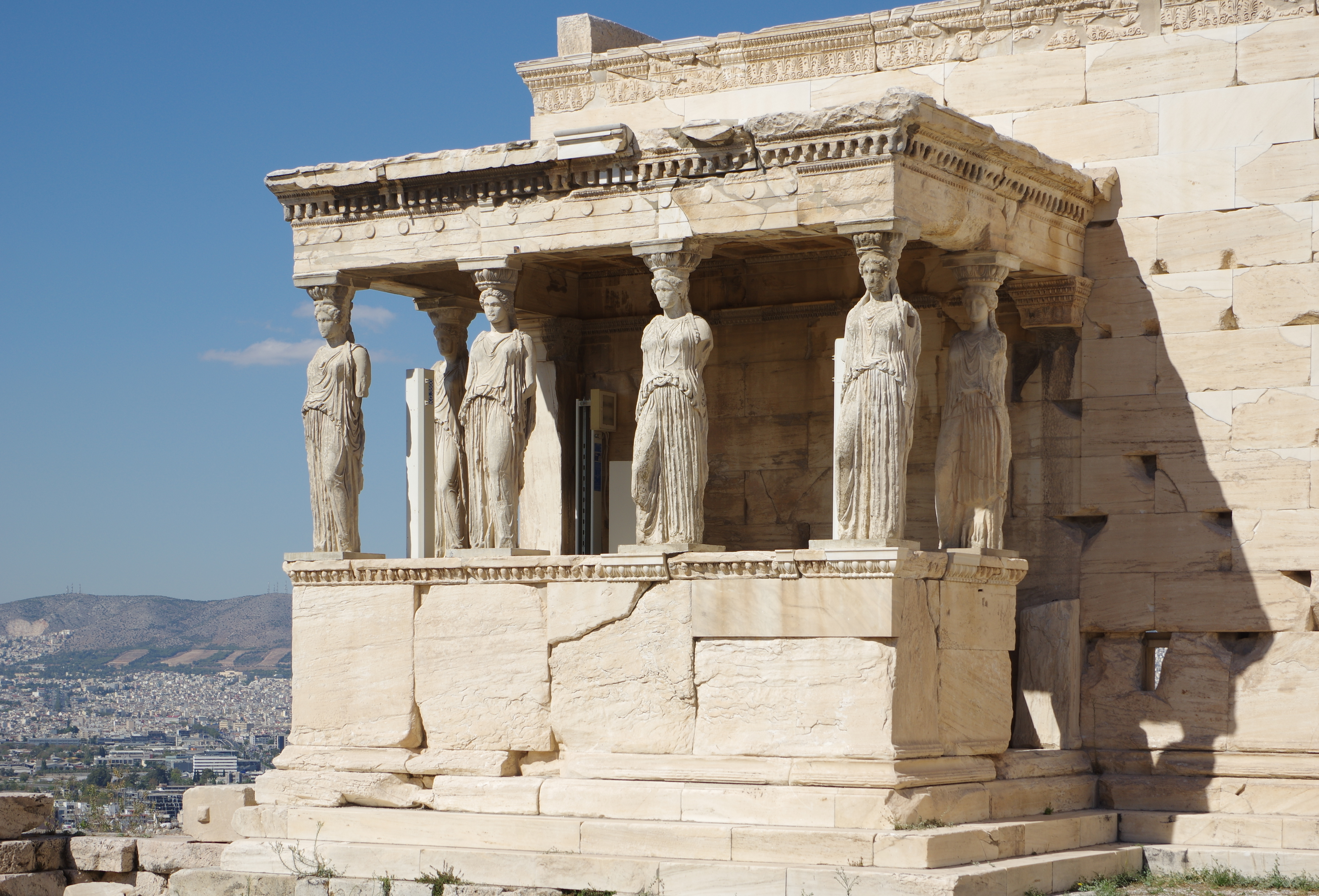
The Erechtheion in Athens, Greece, is associated with some of the most ancient and holy relics of the Athenians, such as the Palladion, a xoanon of Athena Polias

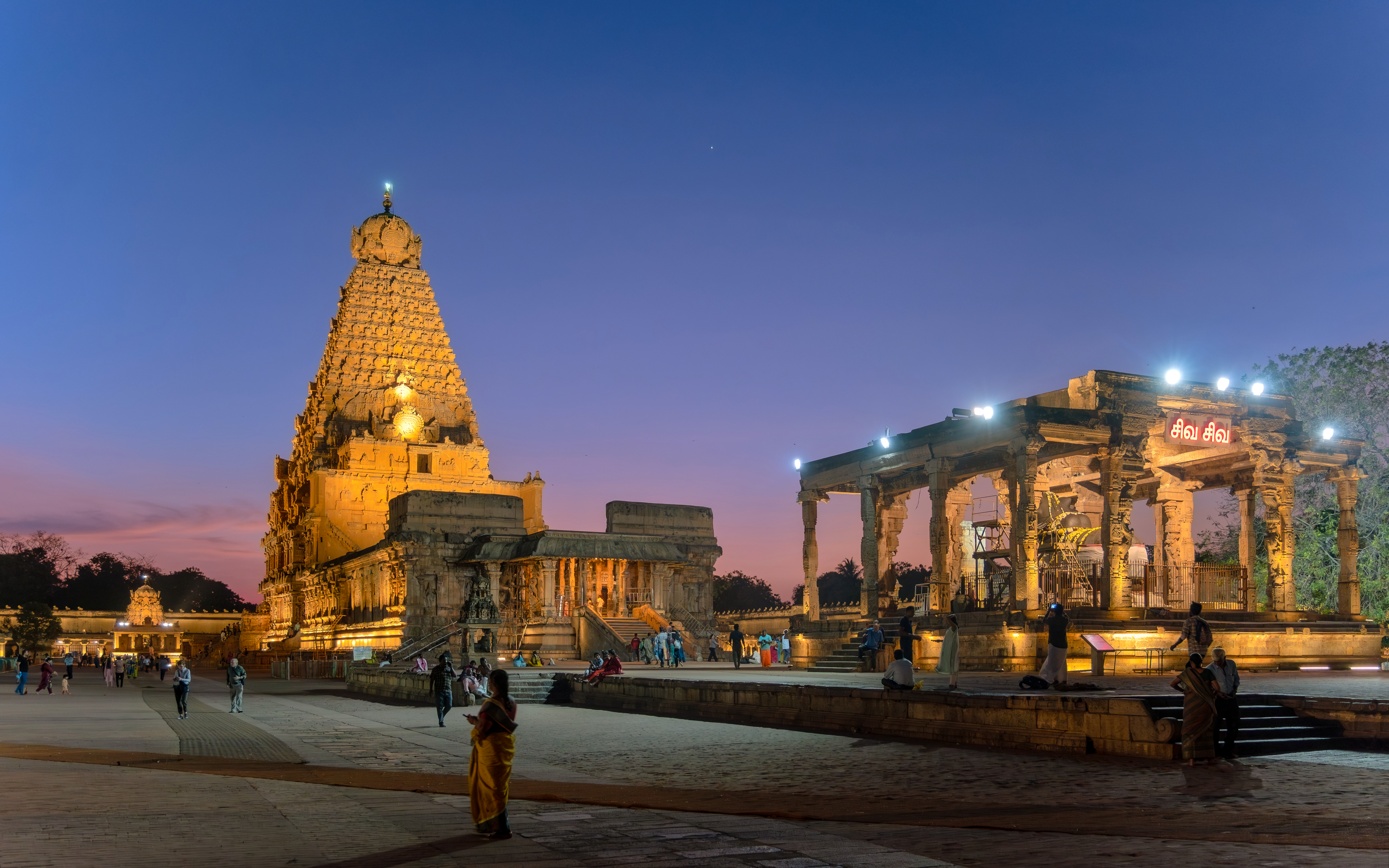
Brihadisvara Temple, an example of a South India - style temple

A temple (from the Latin templum) is a place of worship, a building used for spiritual rituals and activities such as prayer and sacrifice. By convention, the specially built places of worship for some religions are commonly called "temples" in English, while those of other religions are not, even though they fulfill very similar functions.

The religions for which the terms are used include the great majority of ancient religions that are now extinct, such as the Ancient Egyptian religion and the Ancient Greek religion. Among religions still active: Hinduism (whose temples are called mandir or kovil), Buddhism (whose temples are called vihara), Sikhism (whose temples are called gurudwara), Jainism (whose temples are sometimes called derasar), Zoroastrianism (whose temples are sometimes called agiary), the Baháʼí Faith (which are often simply referred to as Baháʼí House of Worship), Taoism (which are sometimes called daoguan), Shinto (which are often called jinja), Confucianism (which are sometimes called the Temple of Confucius).

Religions whose places of worship are generally not called "temples" in English include Christianity with churches, Islam with mosques, and Judaism with synagogues (although some exceptions exist).

The form and function of temples are thus very variable, though they are often considered by believers to be, in some sense, the "house" of one or more deities. Typically, offerings of some form are made to the deity, and other rituals are enacted, and a special group of clergy maintain and operate the temple. The degree to which the whole population of believers can access the building varies significantly; often parts, or even the whole main building, can only be accessed by the clergy. Temples typically have a main building and a larger precinct, which may contain many other buildings or may be a dome-shaped structure, much like an igloo.

The word comes from Ancient Rome, where a templum constituted a sacred precinct as defined by a priest, or augur. It has the same root as the word "template", a plan in preparation for the building that was marked out on the ground by the augur.

== Indian temples ==
=== Hindu temple ===
Hindu temples are known by many different names, varying on region and language, including Alayam, Mandir, Mandira, Ambalam, Gudi, Kavu, Koil, Kovil, Déul, Raul, Devasthana, Devalaya, Devayatan, Devakula, Devagiriha, Degul, Deva Mandiraya, and Devalayam. Hindu temple architecture is mainly divided into the Dravidian style of the south and the Nagara style of the north, with other regional styles including those ancient Hemadpanthi, Bhumija, Solanki, Maratha, and Chalukya style.

The basic elements of the Hindu temple remain the same across all periods and styles. The most essential feature is the inner sanctuary, the garbhagriha or womb-chamber, where the primary murti or cult image of a deity is housed in a simple bare cell. Around this chamber there are often other structures and buildings, in the largest cases covering several acres. On the exterior, the garbhagriha is crowned by a tower-like shikhara, also called the vimana in the south. The shrine building may include an ambulatory for parikrama (circumambulation), one or more mandapas or congregation halls, and sometimes an antarala antechamber and porch between garbhagriha and mandapa.

Some of the early temples had unique features. For example, Kailashnath temple at Ellora was carved out of a single enormous rock.

A Hindu temple is a symbolic house, the seat and dwelling of Hindu gods. It is a structure designed to bring human beings devotion and gods divine connection together according to Hindu faith. It guides an individual towards spiritual knowledge and truth, and ultimate liberation that is Moksha. Inside its garbhagriha innermost sanctum, a Hindu temple contains a murti or Hindu god's image. Hindu temples are large and magnificent with a rich history. There is evidence of the use of sacred ground as far back as the Bronze Age and later during the Indus Valley civilization.

Outside of the Indian subcontinent (India, Bangladesh and Nepal), Hindu temples have been built in various countries around the world. Either following the historic diffusion of Hinduism across Asia (e.g. ancient stone temples of Cambodia and Indonesia), or following the migration of the Indian Hindus' diaspora, to Western Europe (esp. Great Britain), North America (the United States and Canada), as well as Australia, Malaysia, and Singapore, Mauritius, and South Africa.

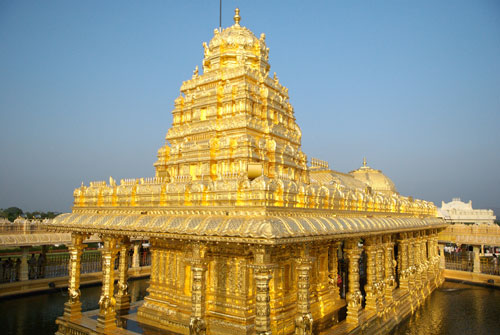
The Golden temple of Mahalakshmi, Vellore, Tamil Nadu, India

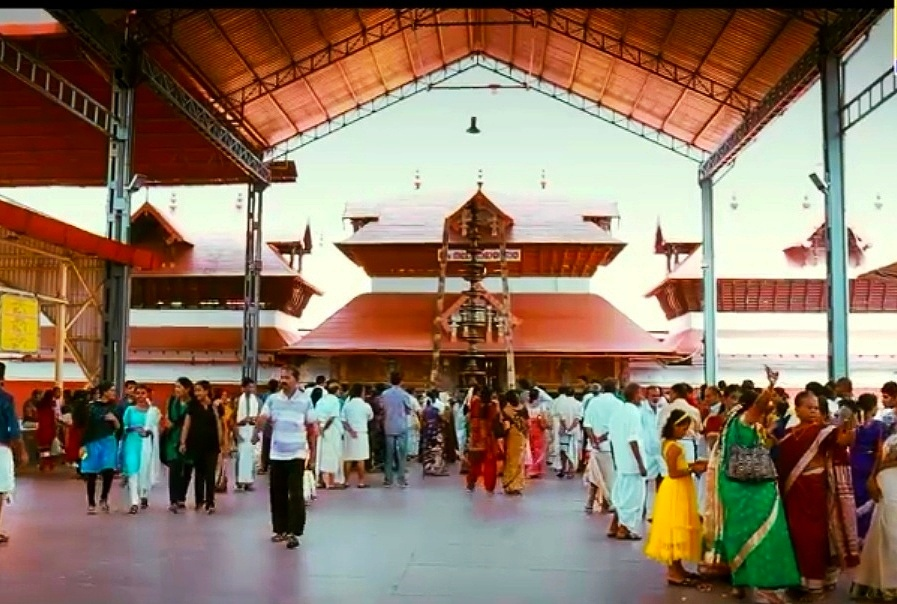
Famous Guruvayur Temple, a Traditional Hindu Temple in Kerala, India.

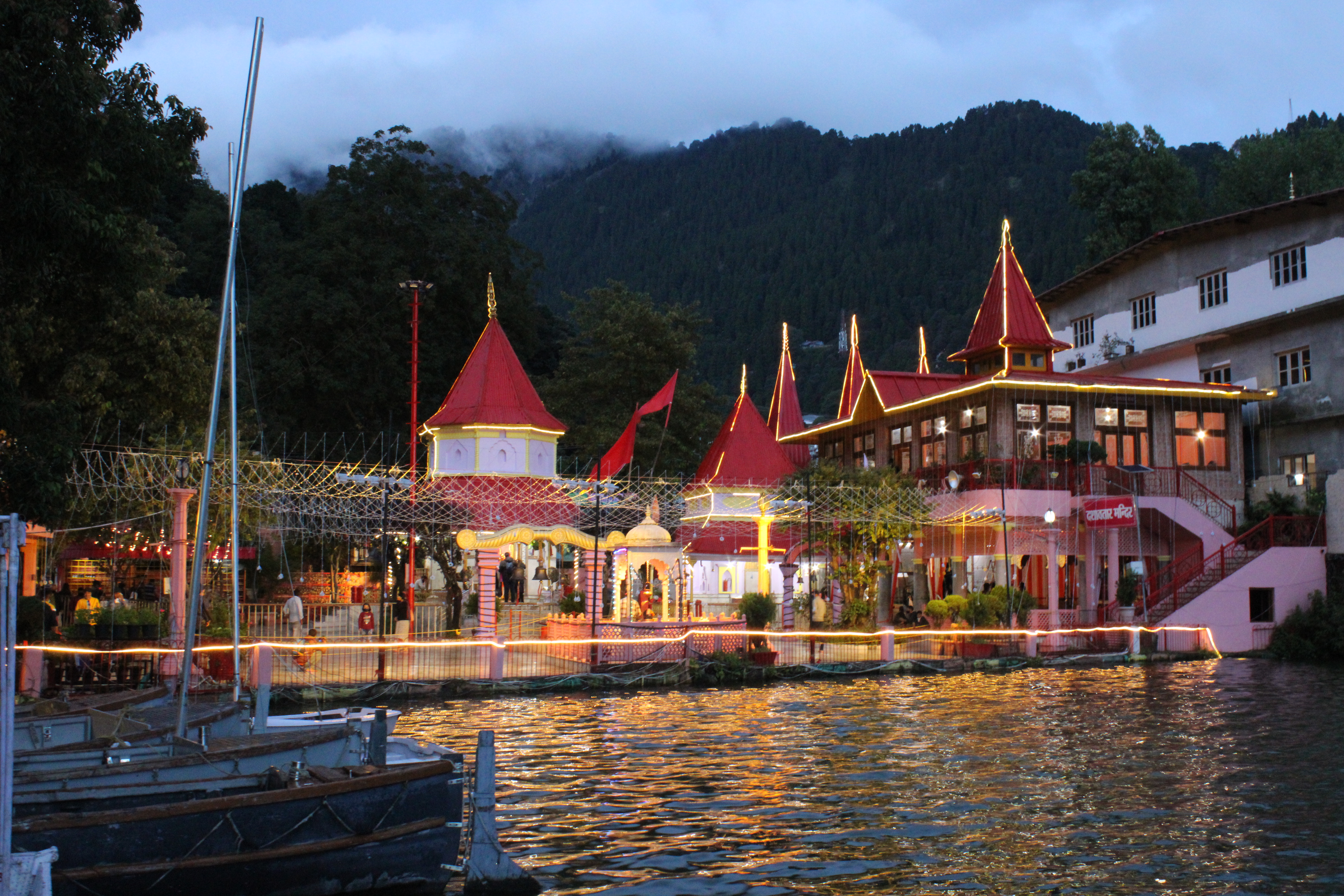
A view of the Maa Naina Devi Temple, Mallital, Nainital, Uttarakhand, India

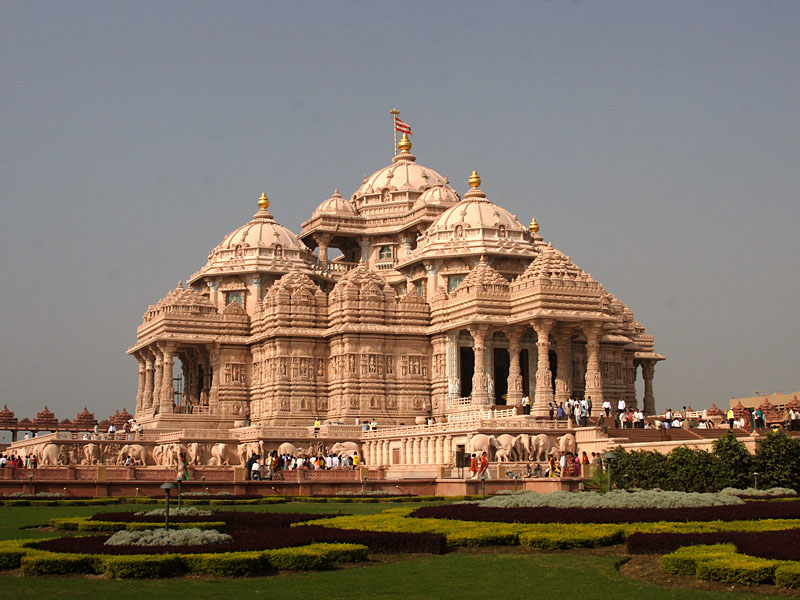
Akshardham Temple, a Hindu temple in New Delhi, India built in 2005.

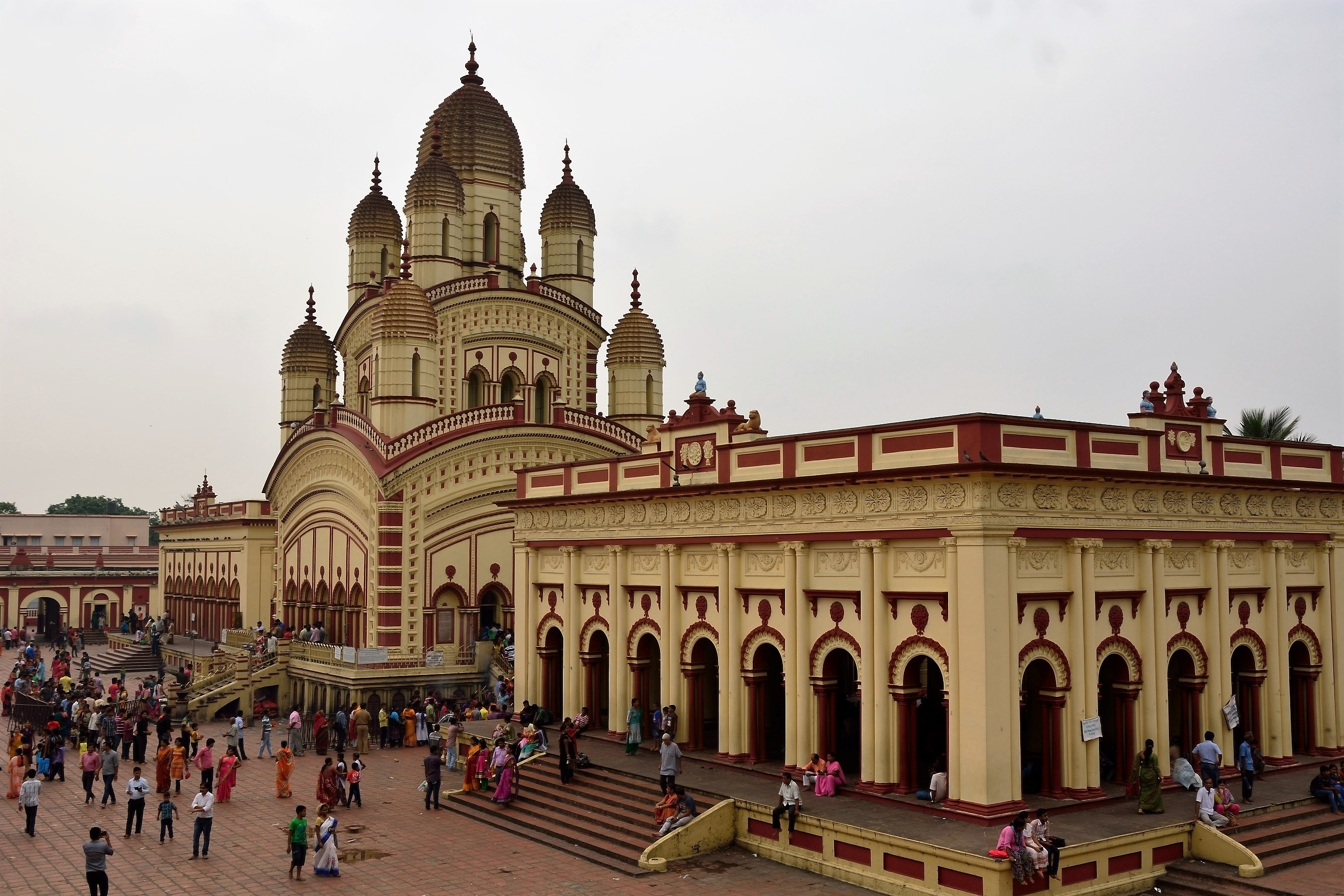
Dakshineswar Kali Temple, a Hindu temple in Greater Kolkata, West Bengal, India

=== Buddhist temples ===
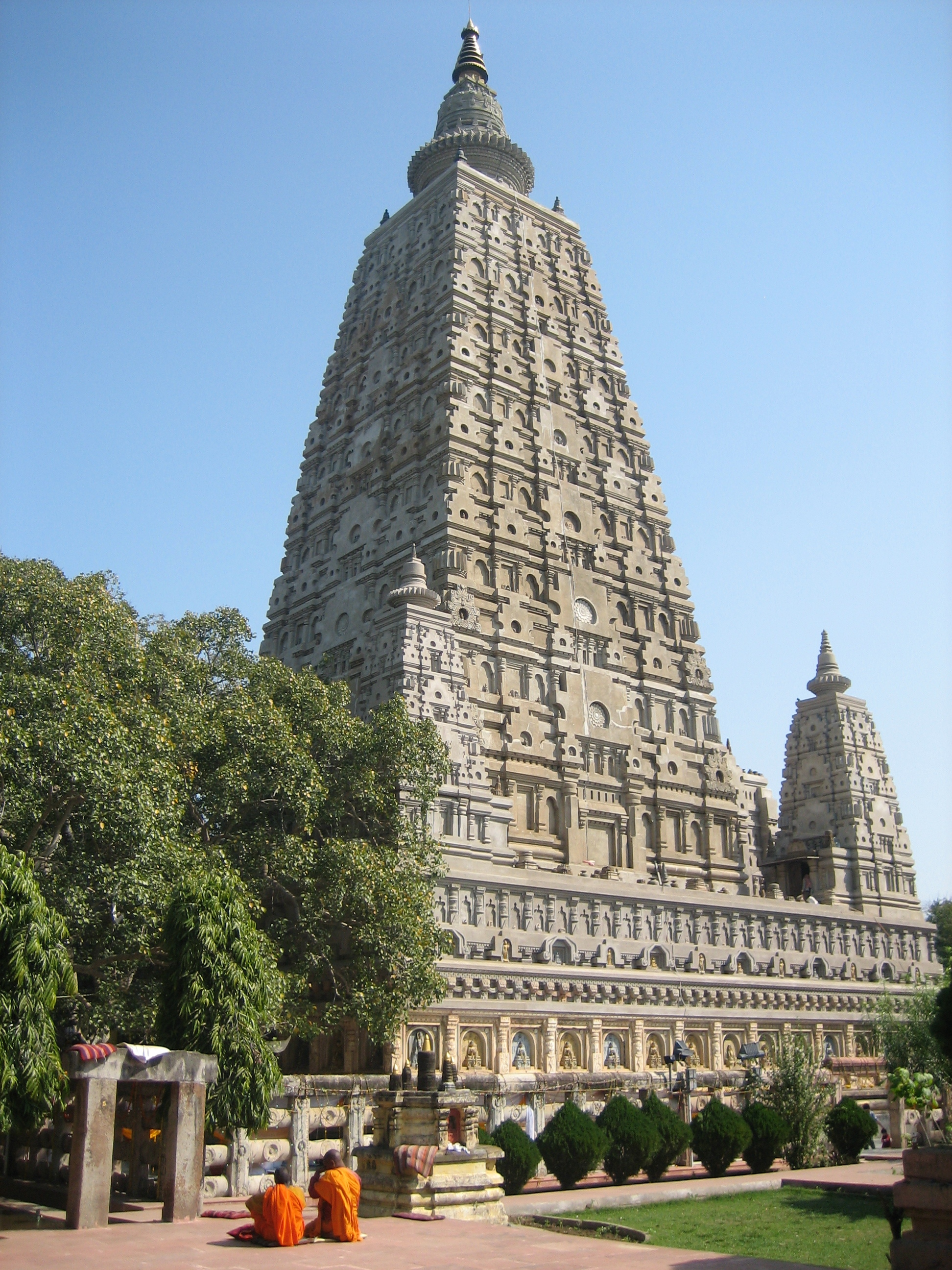
Mahabodhi temple, Bihar, India

Buddhist temples include the structures called stupa, wat and pagoda in different regions and languages. A Buddhist temple might contain a meditation hall hosting Buddharupa, or the image of Buddha, as the object of concentration and veneration during a meditation. The stupa domed structures are also used in a circumambulation ritual called Pradakshina.

Temples in Buddhism represent the pure land or pure environment of a Buddha. Traditional Buddhist temples are designed to inspire inner and outer peace.

Three types of structures are associated with the religious architecture of early Buddhism: monasteries (viharas), places to venerate relics (stupas), and shrines or prayer halls (chaityas, also called chaitya grihas), which later came to be called temples in some places. The pagoda is an evolution of the Indian stupas.

The initial function of a stupa was the veneration and safeguarding of the relics of Gautama Buddha; the earliest archeologically known example of a stupa is the relic stupa located in Vaishali, Bihar, in India.

In accordance with changes in religious practice, stupas were gradually incorporated into chaitya-grihas (prayer halls). These are exemplified by the complexes of the Ajanta Caves and the Ellora Caves (Maharashtra). The Mahabodhi Temple at Bodh Gaya in Bihar is another well-known example.

As Buddhism spread, Buddhist architecture diverged in style, reflecting the similar trends in Buddhist art. Building form was also influenced to some extent by the different forms of Buddhism in the northern countries, practicing Mahayana Buddhism in the main and in the south where Theravada Buddhism prevailed.

=== Jain temples ===
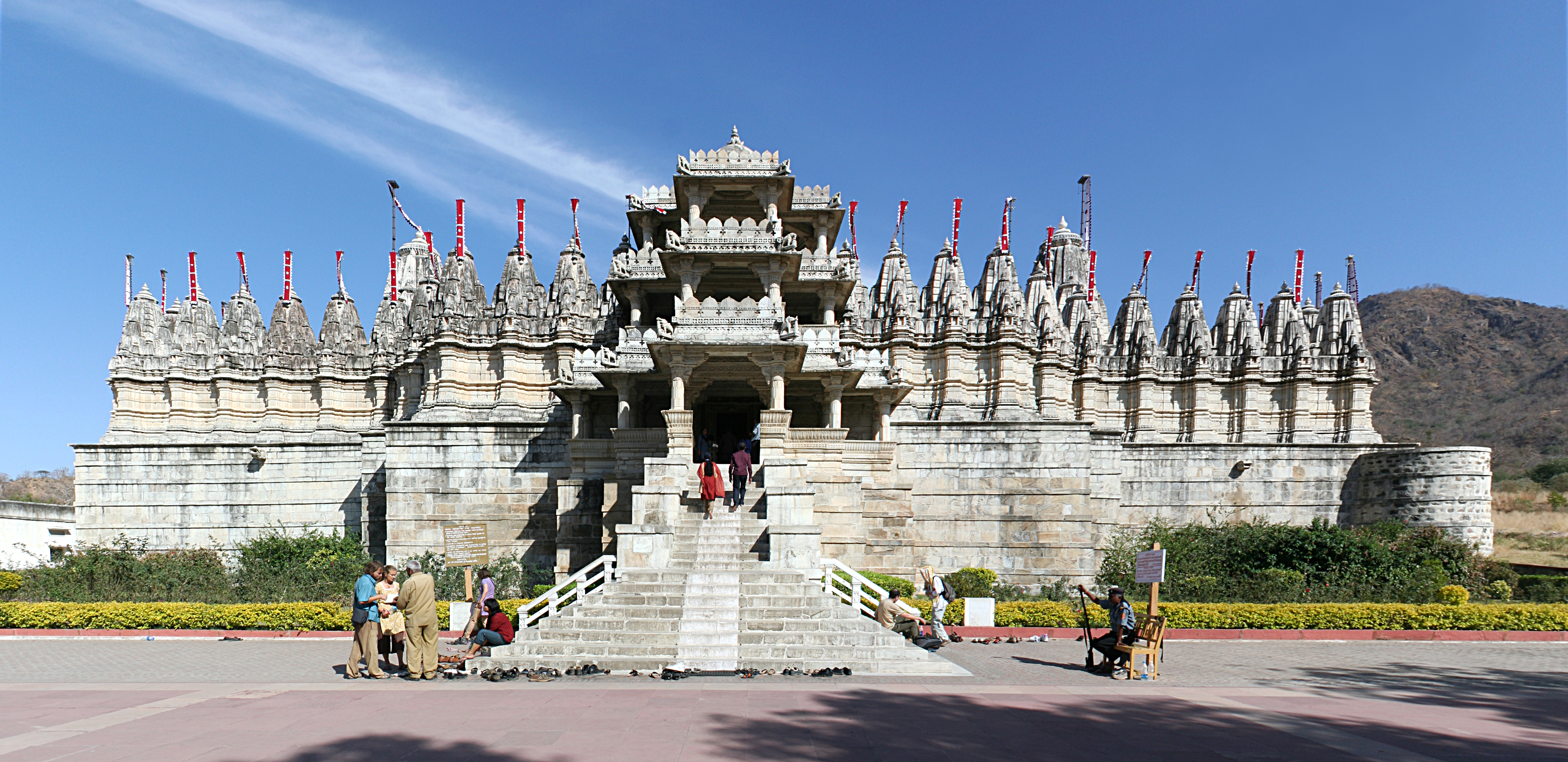
Ranakpur Jain temple, Rajasthan, India.

A Jain temple, called a Derasar, is the place of worship for Jains, the followers of Jainism. Some famous Jain temples are Shikharji, Palitana temples, Ranakpur Jain temple, Shravan Belgola, Dilwara Temples, and Lal Mandir. Jain temples are built with various architectural designs. Jain temples in North India are completely different from the Jain temples in South India, which in turn are quite different from Jain temples in West India. Additionally, a manastambha (literally 'column of honor') is a pillar that is often constructed in front of Jain temples.

=== Sikh temples ===
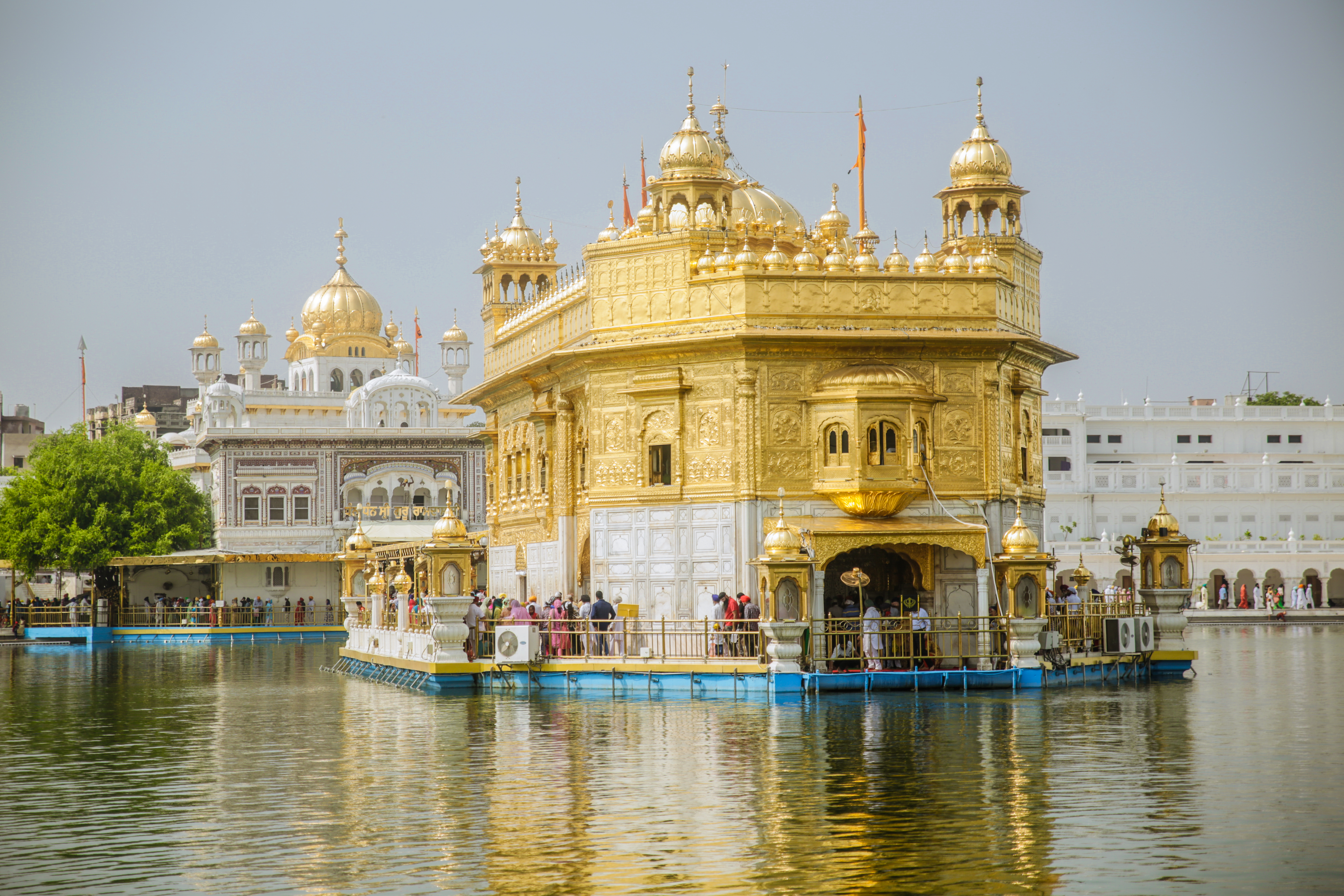
Harmandir Sahib in Amritsar, India

A Sikh temple is called a gurdwara, literally the "doorway to the Guru". Its most essential element is the presence of the Guru, Guru Granth Sahib. The gurdwara has an entrance from all sides, signifying that they are open to all without any distinction whatsoever. The gurdwara has a Darbar Sahib where the Guru Granth Sahib is seen and a Langar where people can eat free food. A gurdwara may also have a library, nursery, and classroom.

== Mesopotamian temples ==
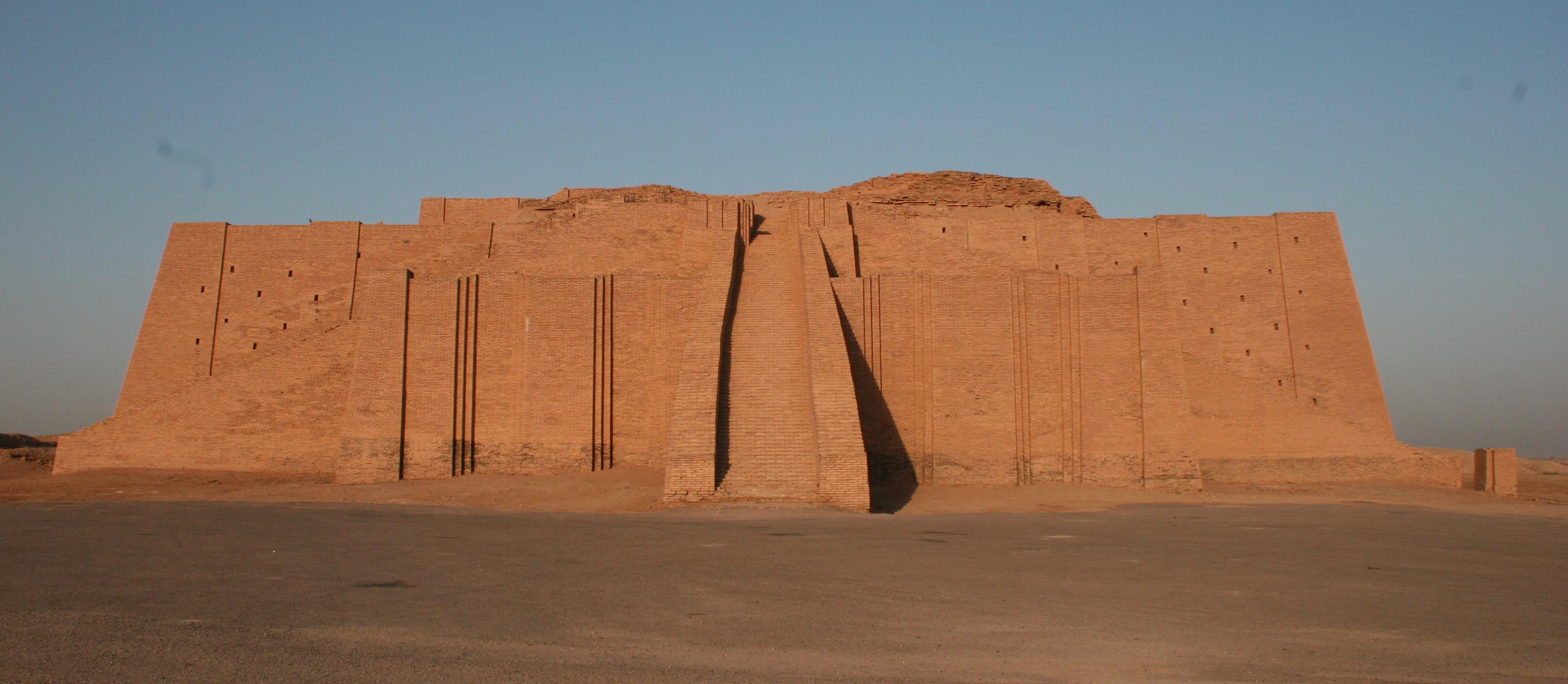
Ziggurat of Ur, Iraq

The temple-building tradition of Mesopotamia derived from the cults of gods and deities in the Mesopotamian religion. It spanned several civilizations; from Sumerian, Akkadian, Assyrian, and Babylonian. The most common temple architecture of Mesopotamia is the structure of sun-baked bricks called a ziggurat, having the form of a terraced step pyramid with a flat upper terrace where the shrine or temple stood.

== Egyptian temples ==
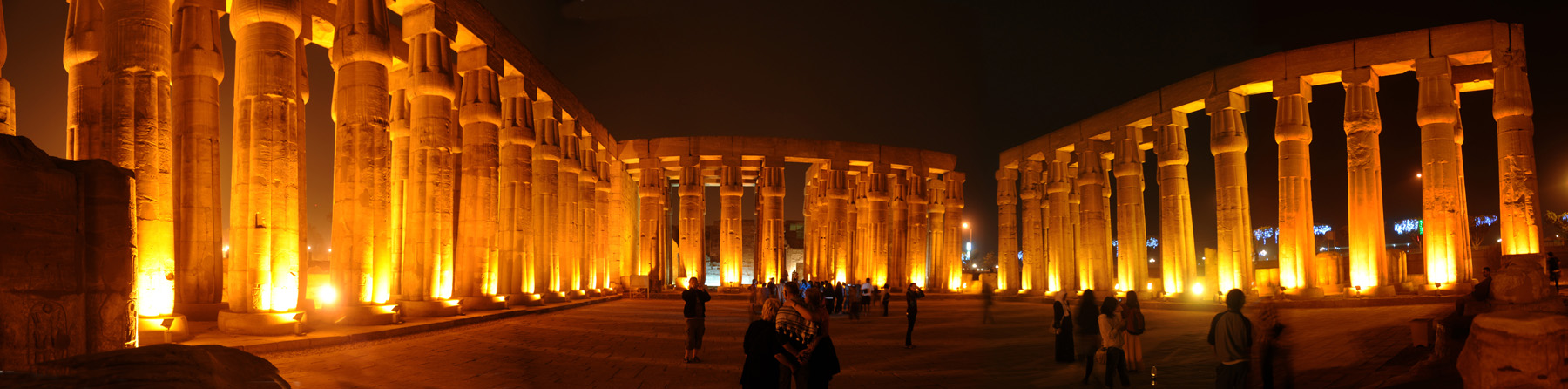
A panoramic view of the interior of the Luxor temple, Luxor, Egypt.

Ancient Egyptian temples were meant as places for the deities to reside on earth. Indeed, the term the Egyptians most commonly used to describe the temple building, ḥwt-nṯr, means 'mansion (or enclosure) of a god'.

A god's presence in the temple linked the human and divine realms and allowed humans to interact with the god through ritual. These rituals, it was believed, sustained the god and allowed it to continue to play its proper role in nature. They were, therefore, a key part of the maintenance of maat, the ideal order of nature and of human society in Egyptian belief. Maintaining maat was the entire purpose of Egyptian religion, and thus it was the purpose of a temple as well.

Ancient Egyptian temples were also of economic significance to Egyptian society. The temples stored and redistributed grain and came to own large portions of the nation's arable land (some estimate as much as 33% by the New Kingdom period). Egyptian temples oft utilized the Tripartite Floor Plan in order to draw visitors to the central room.

Temple of Hathor, Dendera temple complex, Dendera, Egypt

In The Temple in Man, a work by R. A. Schwaller de Lubicz, the author explores the idea that Egyptian temples, particularly the Temple of Luxor, are metaphysical representations of the human body. Schwaller de Lubicz suggests that these temples reflect the cosmic and spiritual order through their proportions and design. The author argues that the ancient Egyptians embedded knowledge of sacred geometry and spiritual awakening into their architecture, and that the human body itself is a temple that mirrors the harmony of the universe. The work connects the metaphysical symbolism of the temples to esoteric concepts, showing how the architecture reflects human anatomy and cosmic laws.

== Greco-Roman temples ==
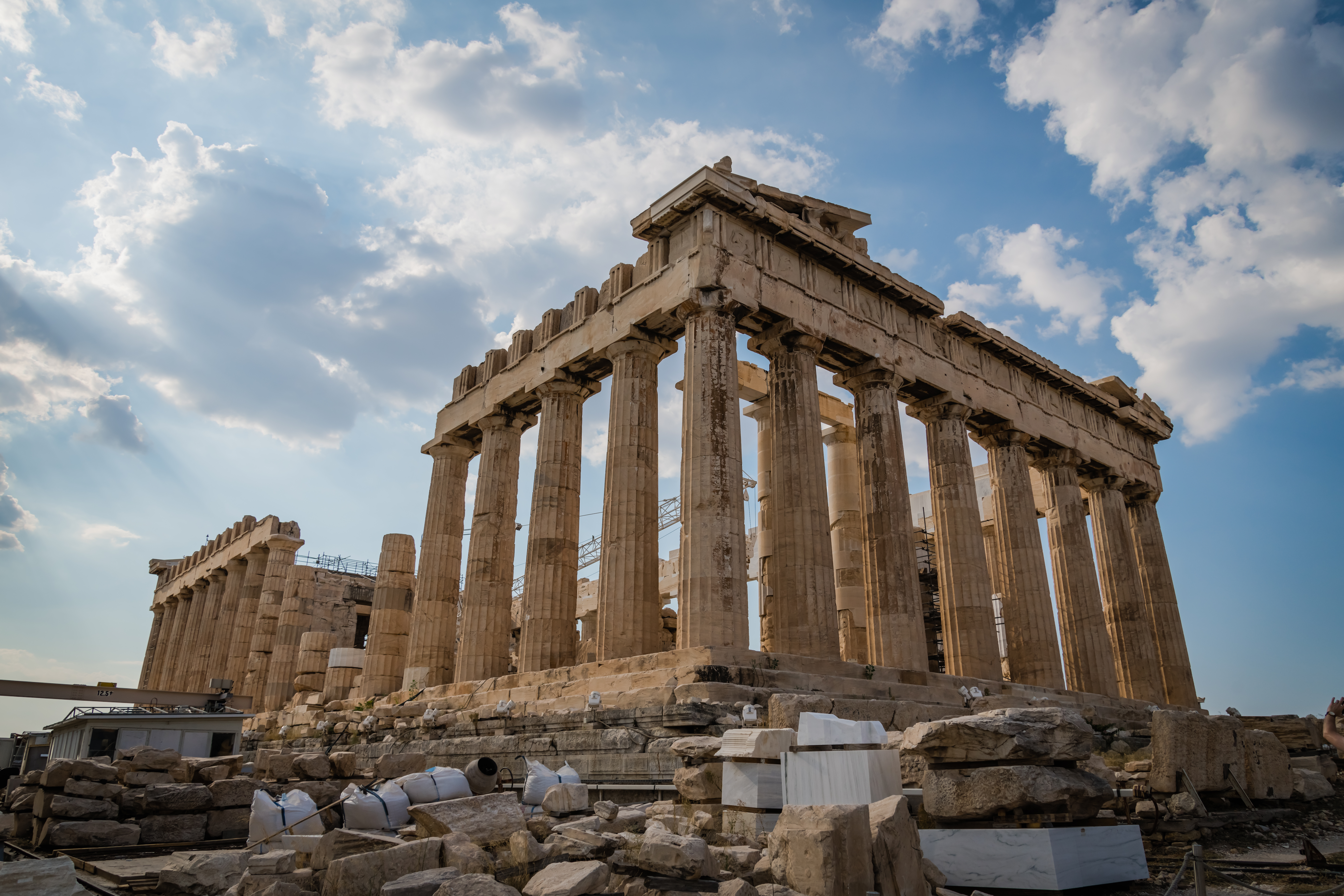
The Parthenon on the Acropolis of Athens

Greek and Roman temples were originally built out of wood and mud bricks, but as the empires expanded, the temples grew to monumental size, made out of materials such as stone and marble on raised platforms. While their colors have long since faded, the columns would have been painted in white, blue, red, and black. Above the columns would have been a sculpted or painted depiction of a myth or battle, with freestanding sculptures in the pediment triangles. The roofs were tiled and had sculptures of mythical animals or deities on the tops or corners. Greek temples also had several standard floor plans with very distinct column placement.

Located in the front of the temple were altars intended for sacrifices or offerings. Ouranic altars were usually square, lined with a metal pan for burnt offerings, and a flat top which was necessary for the ouranic gods to receive offerings. Chthonic altars, called bothros, were pits dug into the earth for liquid libations of animal sacrifices, milk, honey, and wine. The building which housed the cult statue or agalma in its cella was located in the center of the temple in Greek architecture, while in Rome, the cella was in the back. Greek temple architecture had a profound influence on ancient architectural traditions.

Greco-Roman temples were built facing eastward, utilizing the rising sun in morning rituals. The location each temple was built also depended on many factors such as environment, myth, function, and divine experience. Most were built on sites associated with myths or a place a god had been believed to have performed a feat, or founded a town or city. Many Roman temples had close associations with important events in Roman history, such as military victories. Temples in cities were often dedicated to the founding deity of the city, but also served as civic and social centers. The Temple of Saturn even held the state treasury and treasury offices in its basement.

== European polytheistic temples ==
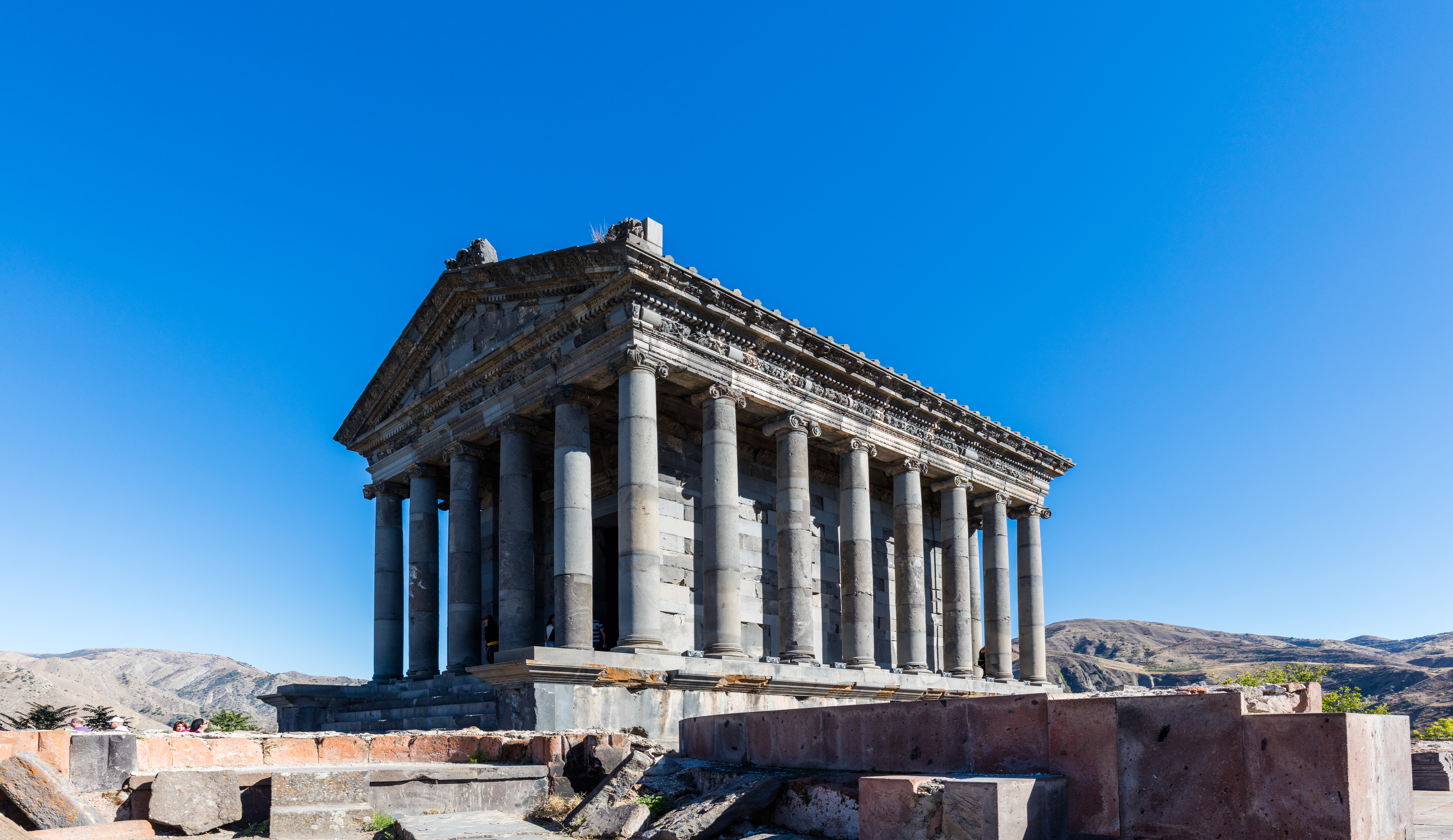
Temple of Garni, Armenia

The Romans usually referred to a holy place of a pagan religion as fanum; in some cases this referred to a sacred grove, in others to a temple. Medieval Latin writers also sometimes used the word templum, previously reserved for temples of the ancient Roman religion. In some cases it is hard to determine whether a temple was a building or an outdoor shrine. For temple buildings of the Germanic peoples, the Old Norse term hof is often used.

== Zoroastrian temples ==
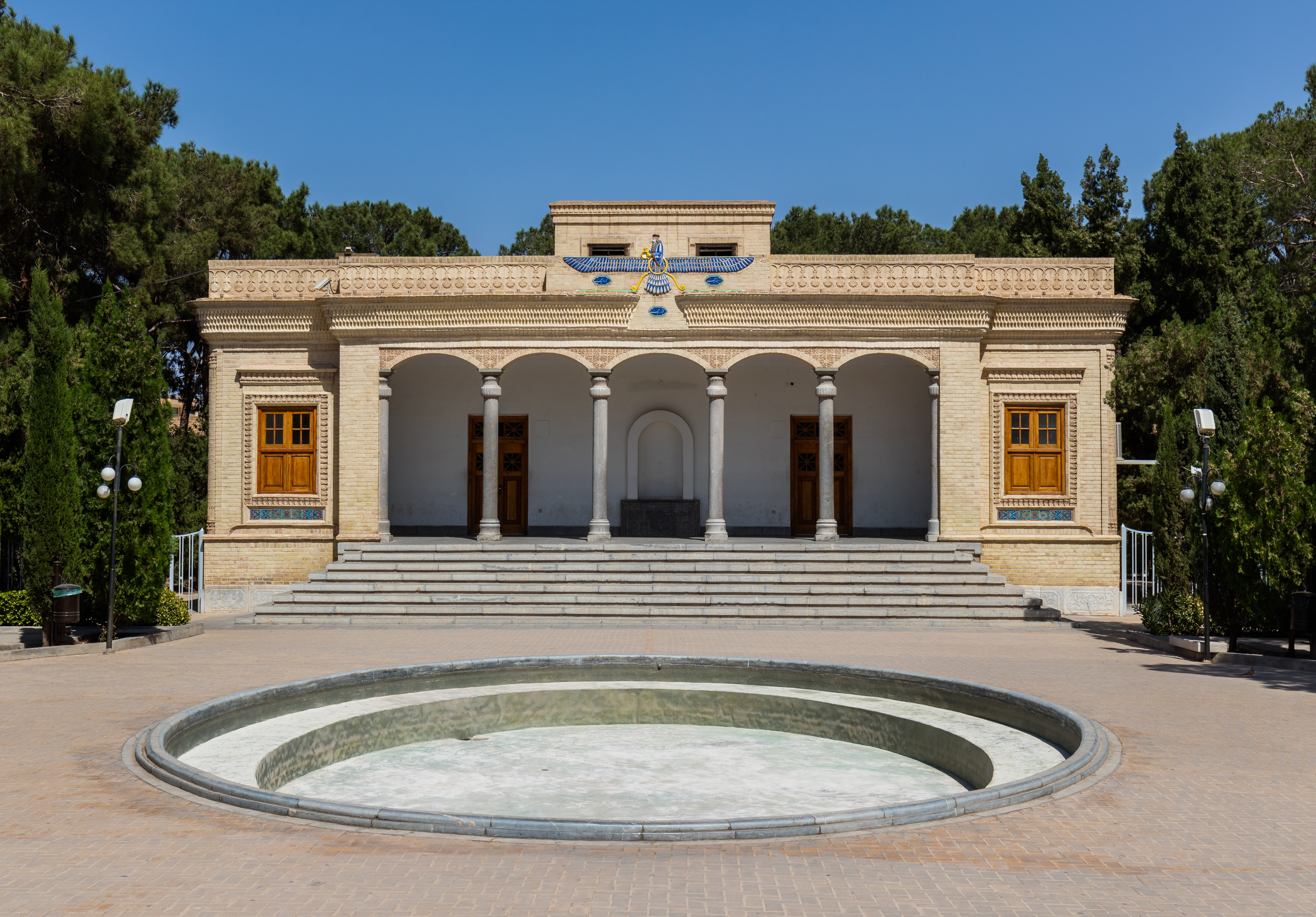
The Yazd Atash Behram

A Zoroastrian temple may also be called a Dar-e-mehr and an Atashkadeh. A fire temple in Zoroastrianism is the place of worship for Zoroastrians. Zoroastrians revere fire in any form, and their temples contains an eternal flame, with Atash Behram (Fire of Victory) as the highest grade of all, as it combines 16 different types of fire gathered in elaborate rituals.

In the Zoroastrian religion, fire (Atar), together with clean water (Aban), are agents of ritual purity. Clean, white "ash for the purification ceremonies is regarded as the basis of ritual life," which, "are essentially the rites proper to the tending of a domestic fire, for the temple fire is that of the hearth fire raised to a new solemnity".

== Chinese temples ==
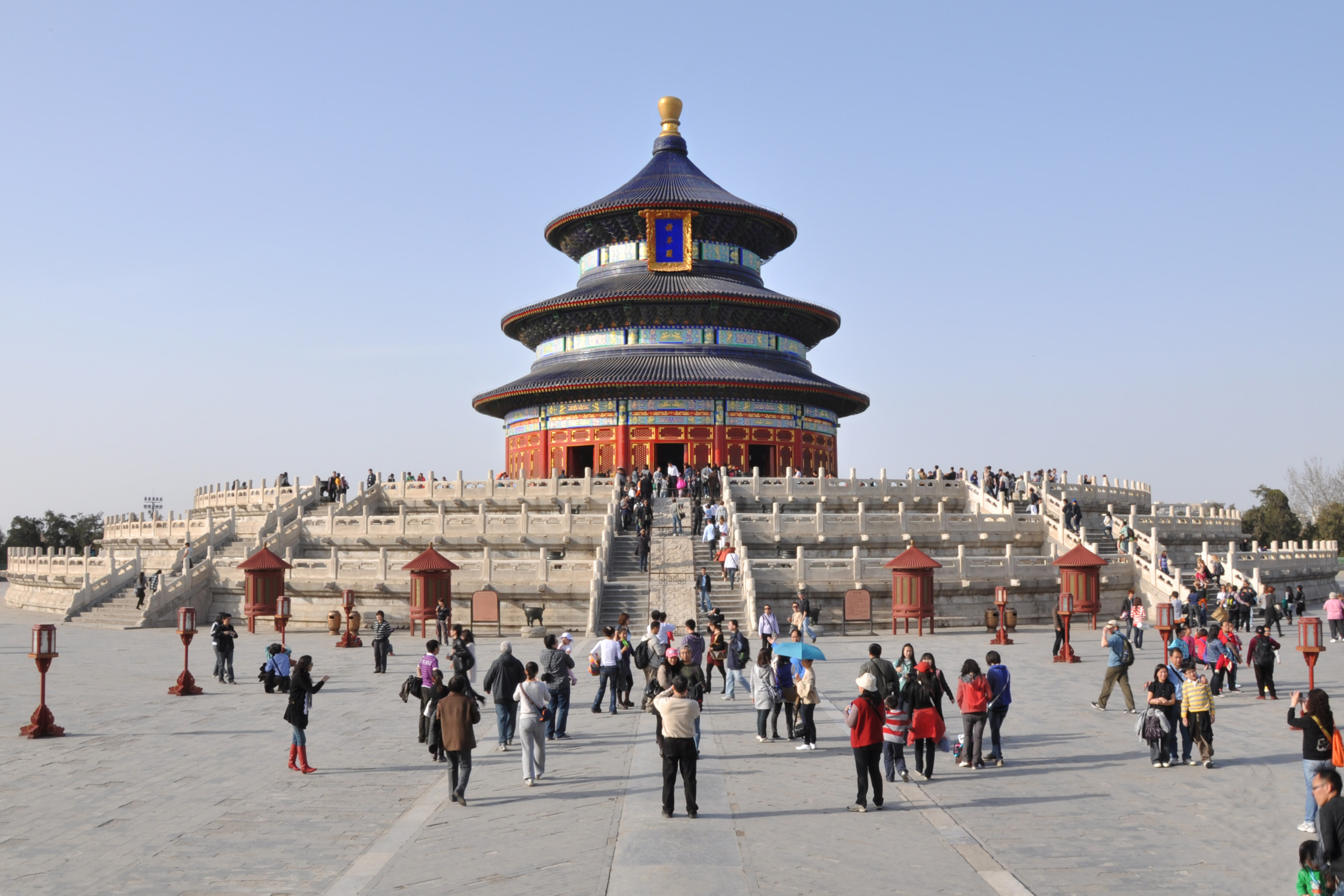
Temple of Heaven, Beijing

Chinese temples refer to temples in accordance with Chinese culture, which serve as a house of worship for Chinese faiths, namely Confucianism, Taoism, Buddhism and Chinese folk religion. Chinese temples were born from the age-old religion and tradition of Chinese people since the ancient era of imperial China, thus they are usually built in typical classical Chinese architecture.

Most parts of Chinese temples are made of timber carpentry, with the exception of brick masonry and glazed ceramics for roofs and tile decorations and bases constructed from an elevated platform of earth and stones. Typical Chinese temples have curved overhanging eaves and complicated carpentry of stacked roof construction;their roofs are often decorated with mythical beasts and deities.. Chinese temples are known for their vivid colors and rich decorations.

Chinese temples can be found throughout Mainland China and Taiwan, and also where Chinese expatriate communities have settled abroad; thus Chinese temples can be found in Chinatowns worldwide.

== Indonesian temples ==
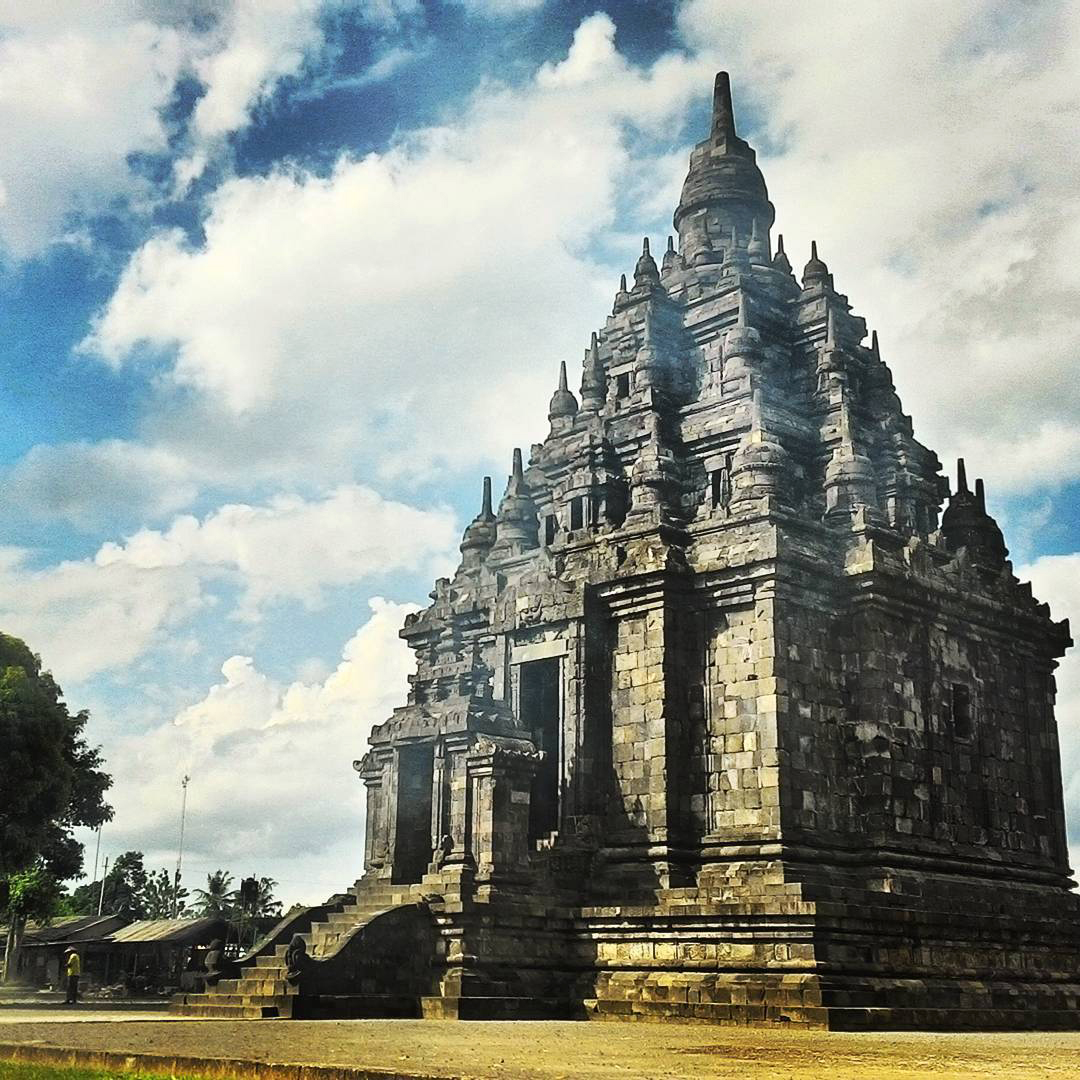
Sojiwan temple, an example of typical 9th-century Javanese temple architecture.

Candi is an Indonesian term to refer to ancient temples. Before the rise of Islam, between the 5th to 15th centuries, Dharmic faiths (Hinduism and Buddhism) were the majority in the Indonesian archipelago, especially in Java and Sumatra. As a result, numerous Hindu temples, locally known as candi, were constructed and dominated the landscape of Java. The candi architecture follows the typical Indonesian architectural traditions based on Vastu Shastra. The temple layout, especially in the Central Java period, incorporated mandala temple plan arrangements and also the typical high towering spires of Hindu temples. The candi was designed to mimic Meru, the holy mountain and the abode of the gods. In contemporary Indonesian Buddhist perspective, candi refers to a shrine, either ancient or new. Several contemporary viharas in Indonesia, for example, contain an actual-size replica or reconstruction of famous Buddhist temples, such as the replica of Pawon and Plaosan's perwara (small) temples.

According to local beliefs, the Java valley had thousands of Hindu temples that co-existed with Buddhist temples, most of which were buried in the massive eruption of Mount Merapi in 1006 CE.

== Mesoamerican temples ==
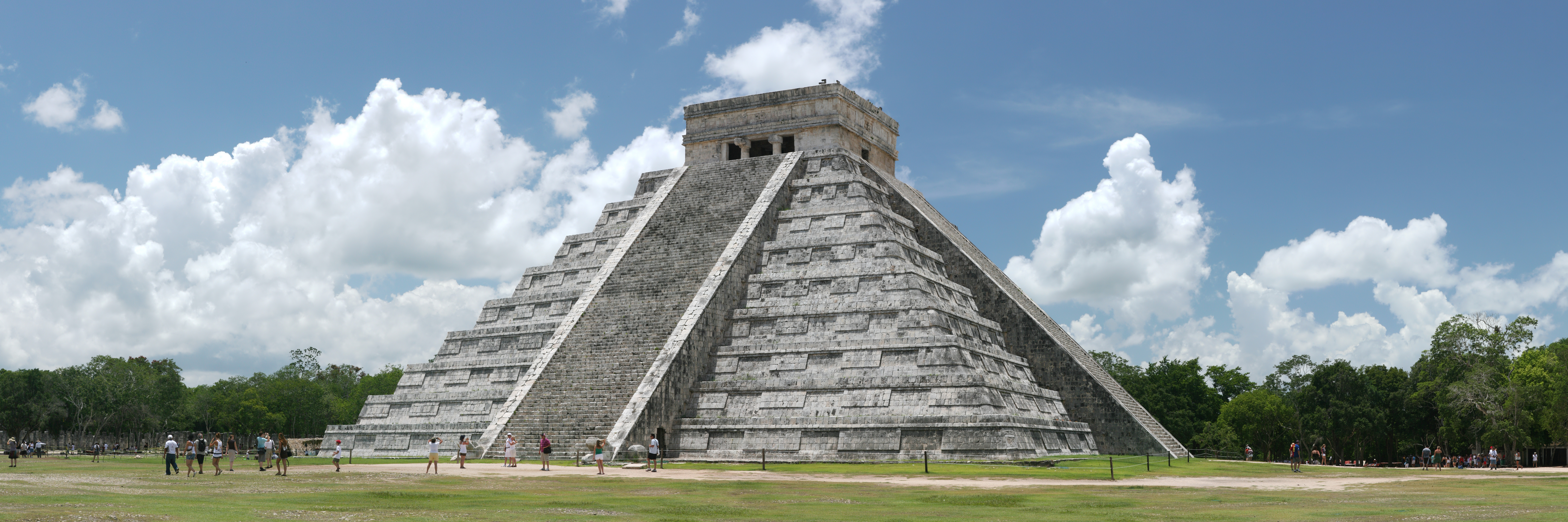
Temple of Kukulcan in Chichen Itza located on top of Kukulcan pyramid.

Temples of the Mesoamerican civilization usually took the shape of stepped pyramids with temples or shrines on top of the massive structure. They are more akin to the ziggurats of Mesopotamia than to Egyptian ones. A single or several flight(s) of steep steps from the base lead to the temple that stood on the plateau on top of the pyramid. The stone temple might be a square or a rounded structure with a door opening leading to a cella or inner sanctum. The plateau on top of the pyramid in front of the temple is where the ritualistic sacrifice took place.

Some classic Mesoamerican pyramids are adorned with stories about the feathered serpent Quetzalcoatl or Mesoamerican creation myths, written in the form of hieroglyphs on the rises of the steps of the pyramids, on the walls, and on the sculptures contained within. Notable example include Aztec Acatitlan and Mayan Chichen Itza, Uxmal and Tikal.

== Jewish synagogues and temples ==
In Judaism, the ancient Hebrew texts refer to a "sanctuary", "palace" or "hall" for each of the two ancient temples in Jerusalem, called in the Tanakh Beit YHWH, which translates literally as 'YHWH's House'. In English "temple" is the normal term for them.

The Temple Mount in Jerusalem is the site where the First Temple of Solomon and the Second Temple were built. At the center of the structure was the Holy of Holies where only the High Priest could enter. The Temple Mount is now the site of the Islamic edifice, the Dome of the Rock (c. 690 CE).

The Greek word synagogue came into use to describe Jewish (and Samaritan) places of worship during Hellenistic times and it, along with the Yiddish term shul, and the original Hebrew term Beit Knesset ('House of meeting') are the terms in most universal usage.

Since the 18th century, Jews in Western and Central Europe began to apply the name temple, borrowed from the French where it was used to denote all non-Catholic prayer houses, to synagogues. The term became strongly associated with Reform institutions, in some of which both congregants and outsiders associated it with the elimination of the prayers for the restoration of the Jerusalem Temple, though this was not the original meaning—traditional synagogues named themselves "temple" over a century before the advent of Reform, and many continued to do so after. In American parlance, temple is often synonymous with synagogue, but especially non-Orthodox ones.

The term kenesa, from the Aramaic for 'assembly', is used to describe the places of worship of Karaite Jews.

Example of such temple is the Sofia Synagogue, Bulgaria the largest synagogue in Southeastern Europe and third-largest in Europe.

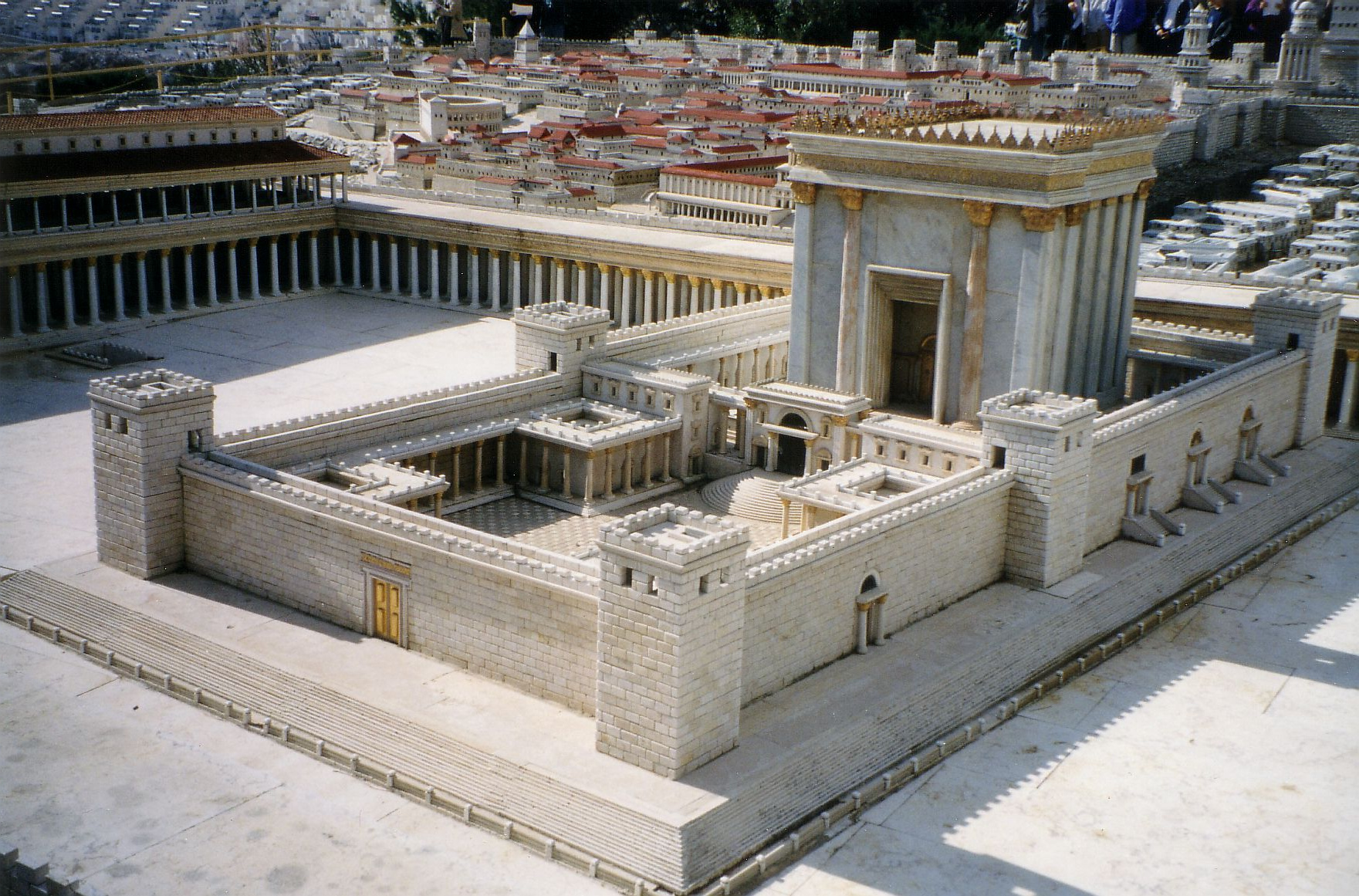
A model of Herod's Temple adjacent to the Shrine of the Book exhibit at the Israel Museum, Jerusalem.

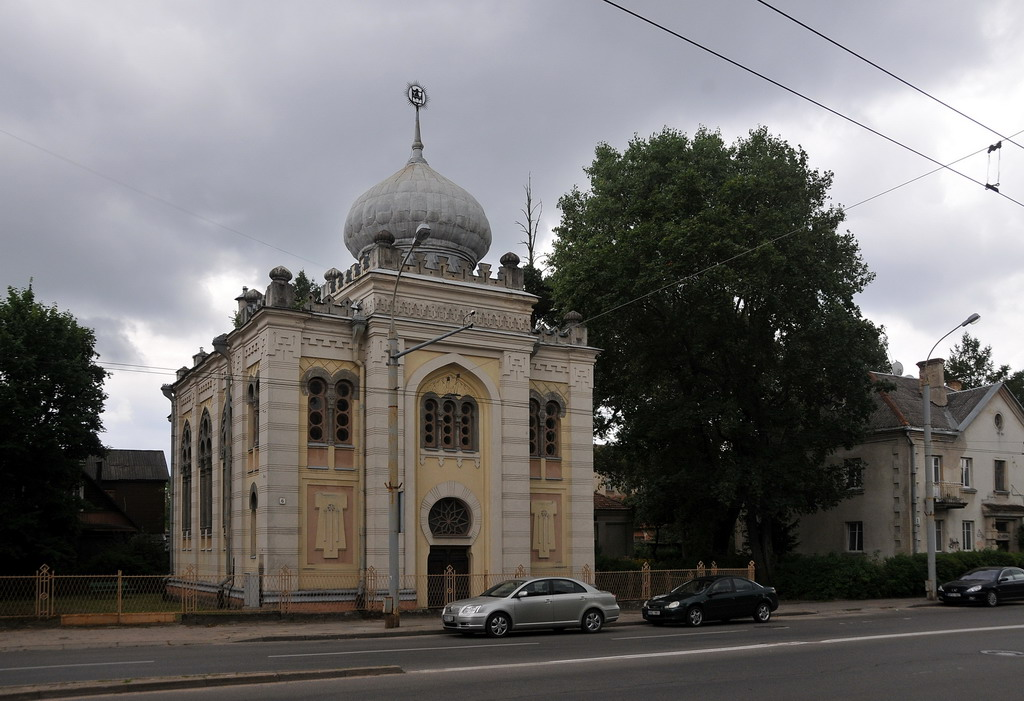
The Kenesa in Vilnius, Lithuania.

== Christian temples ==
=== Orthodox Christianity ===
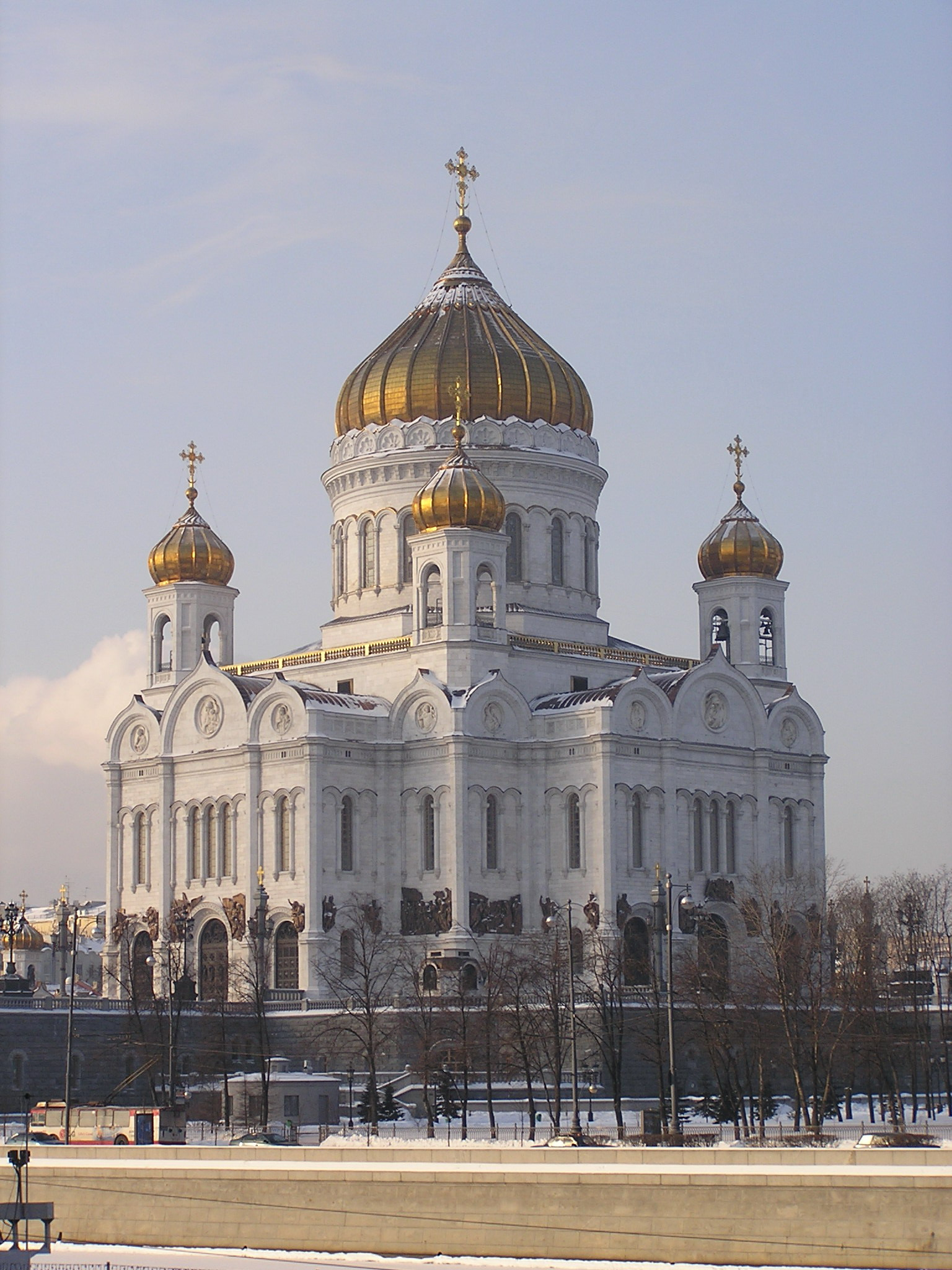
Cathedral of Christ the Saviour in Moscow, Russia

The word temple is used frequently in the tradition of Eastern Christianity; particularly the Eastern Orthodox Church, where the principal words used for houses of worship are temple and church. The use of the word temple comes from the need to distinguish a building of the church vs. the church seen as the Body of Christ. In the Russian language (similar to other Slavic languages), while the general-purpose word for 'church' is tserkov, the term khram (Храм), 'temple', is used to refer to the church building as a temple of God (Khram Bozhy). The words church and temple, in this case are interchangeable; however, the term church (Ancient Greek: ἐκκλησία) is far more common. The term temple (Ancient Greek: ναός) is also commonly applied to larger churches. Some famous churches which are referred to as temples include the Hagia Sophia, Saint Basil's Cathedral, Alexander Nevsky Cathedral, Sofia, the Cathedral of Christ the Savior and the Temple of Saint Sava in Belgrade, Serbia.

=== Catholicism ===
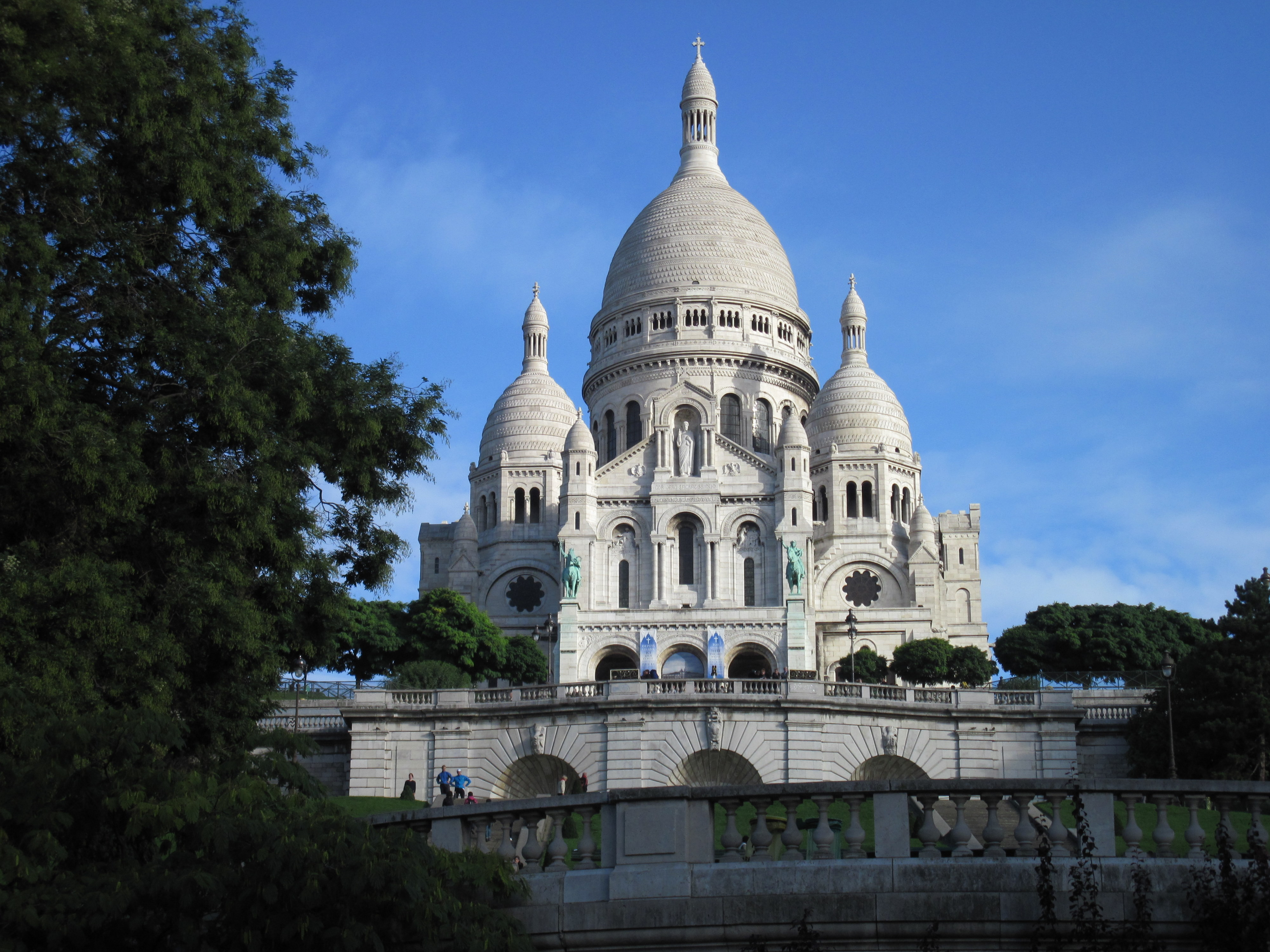
Basilique du Sacré-Coeur in Paris

The word temple has traditionally been rarely used in the English-speaking Western Christian tradition. In Irish, some pre-schism churches use the word teampall. The usual word for church in the Hungarian language is templom, also deriving from the same Latin root. Spanish distinguishes between the temple being the physical building for religious activity, and the church being both the physical building for religious activity and also the congregation of religious followers.

The principal words typically used to distinguish houses of worship in Western Christian architecture are abbey, basilica, cathedral, chapel and church. The Catholic Church has used the word temple in reference of a place of worship on rare occasions. An example is the Roman Catholic Sagrada Familia Temple in Barcelona, Spain, and the Roman Catholic Basilique du Sacré-Cœur Temple in Paris, France. Another example is the Temple or Our Lady of the Pillar, a church in Guadalajara, Mexico.

=== Protestantism ===
Some Protestant churches use this term; above the main entrance of the Lutheran Gustaf Vasa Church in Stockholm, Sweden, is a cartouche in Latin which reads "this temple (...) was constructed by king Oscar II."

Beginning in the late 18th century, following the Enlightenment, some Protestant denominations in France and elsewhere began to use the word temple to distinguish these spaces from Catholic churches. Evangelical and other Protestant churches make use of a wide variety of terms to designate their worship spaces, such as church, tabernacle or temple. Additionally, some breakaway Catholic churches such as the Mariavite Church in Poland have chosen to also designate their central church building as a temple, as in the case of the Temple of Mercy and Charity in Płock.

=== Latter Day Saint movement ===
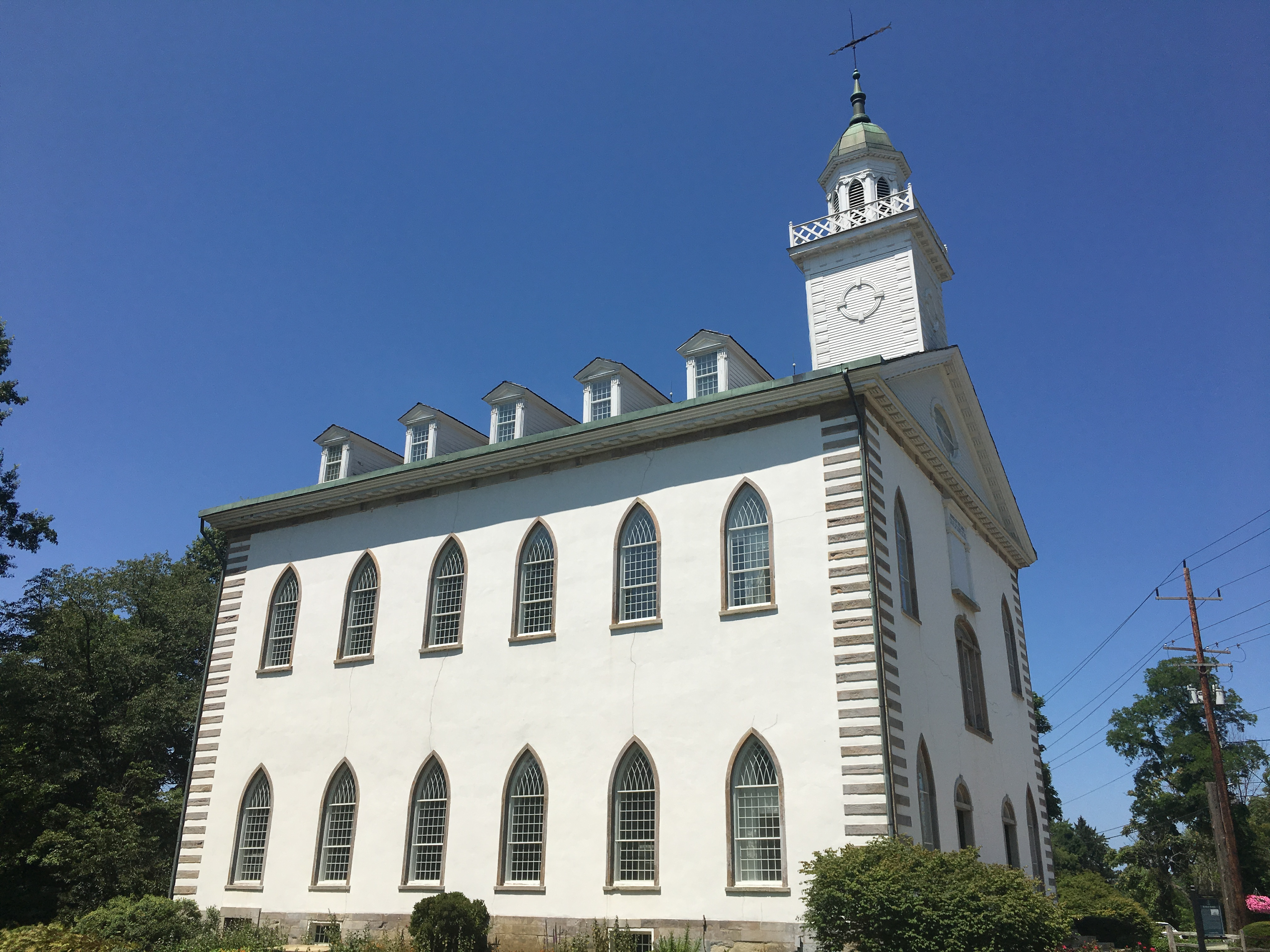
Kirtland Temple in Kirtland, Ohio

According to Latter Day Saints, in 1832, Joseph Smith received a revelation to restore the practice of temple worship, in a "house of the Lord". The Kirtland Temple was the first temple of the Latter-day Saint movement and the only one completed in Smith's lifetime, although the Nauvoo Temple was partially complete at the time of his death. The schisms stemming from a succession crisis have led to differing views about the role and use of temples between various groups with competing succession claims.

The Book of Mormon, which Latter Day Saints believe is a companion book of scripture with the Bible, refers to temple building in the ancient Americas by a group of people called the Nephites. Though Book of Mormon authors are not explicit about the practices in these Nephite temples, they were patterned "after the manner of the temple of Solomon" and served as gathering places for significant religious and political events (e.g. Mosiah 1–6; 3rd Nephi 11–26).

==== The Church of Jesus Christ of Latter-day Saints ====
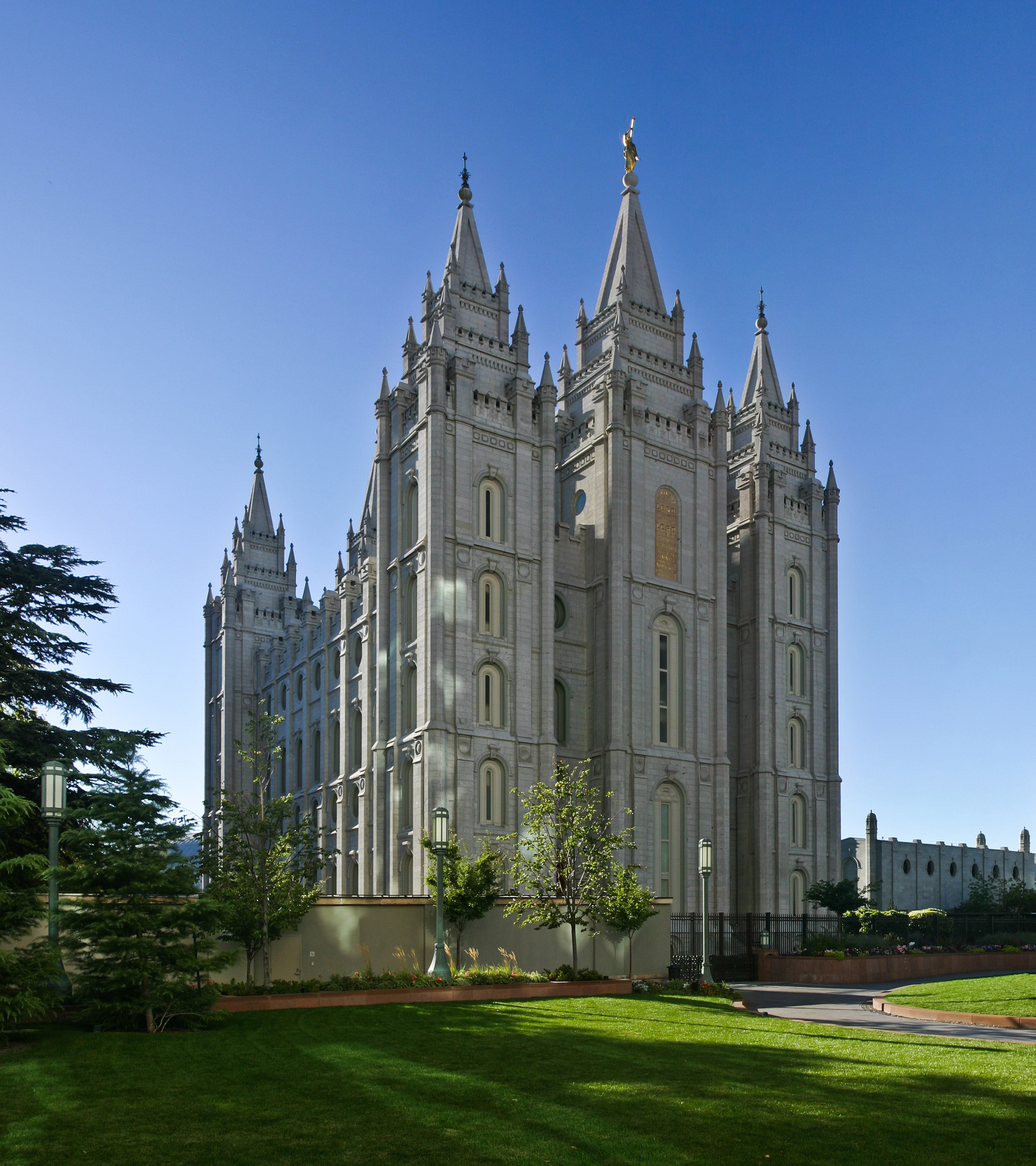
LDS temple in Salt Lake City, Utah

The Church of Jesus Christ of Latter-day Saints is a prolific builder of temples. The LDS Church has 385 temples in various phases, which includes 227 dedicated temples (221 operating, 6 undergoing renovations), 8 with dedications scheduled, 57 under construction, 7 with groundbreaking ceremonies scheduled, and 86 others announced (not yet under construction). Latter-day Saint temples are reserved for performing and undertaking only the most holy and sacred of covenants and special of ordinances. They are distinct from meeting houses and chapels where weekly worship services are held. The temples are built and kept under strict sacredness and are not to be defiled. Thus, strict rules apply for entrance, including church membership and regular attendance. During the open-house period after its construction and before its dedication, the temple is open to the public for tours.

==== Other Latter Day Saint denominations ====
Various sects in the Latter Day Saint movement founded by Joseph Smith have temples.

- The Church of Christ (Wightite), a Latter Day Saint denomination formed by Lyman Wight following the death of Joseph Smith, built the first Mormon temple west of the Mississippi in Zodiac, Texas. about three miles from Fredericksburg.
- In 1990 or earlier, a temple in Ozumba, Mexico, was built by the Apostolic United Brethren.
- On April 17, 1994, the Independence Temple in Independence, Missouri, was opened by the Community of Christ by then-church Prophet-President Wallace B. Smith. The Community of Christ also owned the original Kirtland Temple, dedicated in 1836 by the Church of the Latter Day Saints (later renamed the Church of Jesus Christ of Latter Day Saints), in Kirtland, Ohio. On March 5, 2024, the Church of Jesus Christ of Latter-day Saints announced it had purchased the temple.
- In 2005 construction on the YFZ Ranch Temple by the Fundamentalist Church of Jesus Christ of Latter-Day Saints Church began. It is located just outside Eldorado in Schleicher County, Texas. However, as of April 2014, the State of Texas took physical and legal possession of the property. as it was used to "commit or facilitate certain criminal conduct".
- A pyramid-shaped temple near Modena, Utah, was built by the Righteous Branch of the Church of Jesus Christ of Latter-day Saints.

=== Esoteric Christianity ===
- Mount Ecclesia Esoteric Christian Temple of the Rosicrucian Fellowship with its round 12-sided building architecture set on top of a mesa and facing east, the rising Sun. This modern-day temple is ornamented with alchemical and astrological symbols.

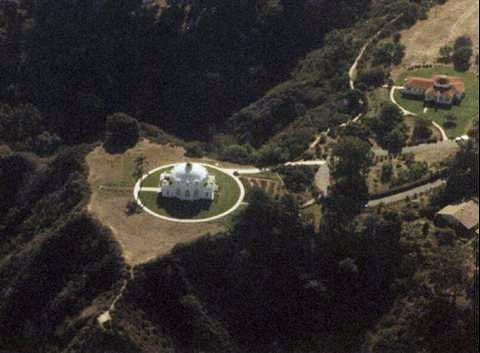
Mount Ecclesia's Temple

== Masonic temples ==
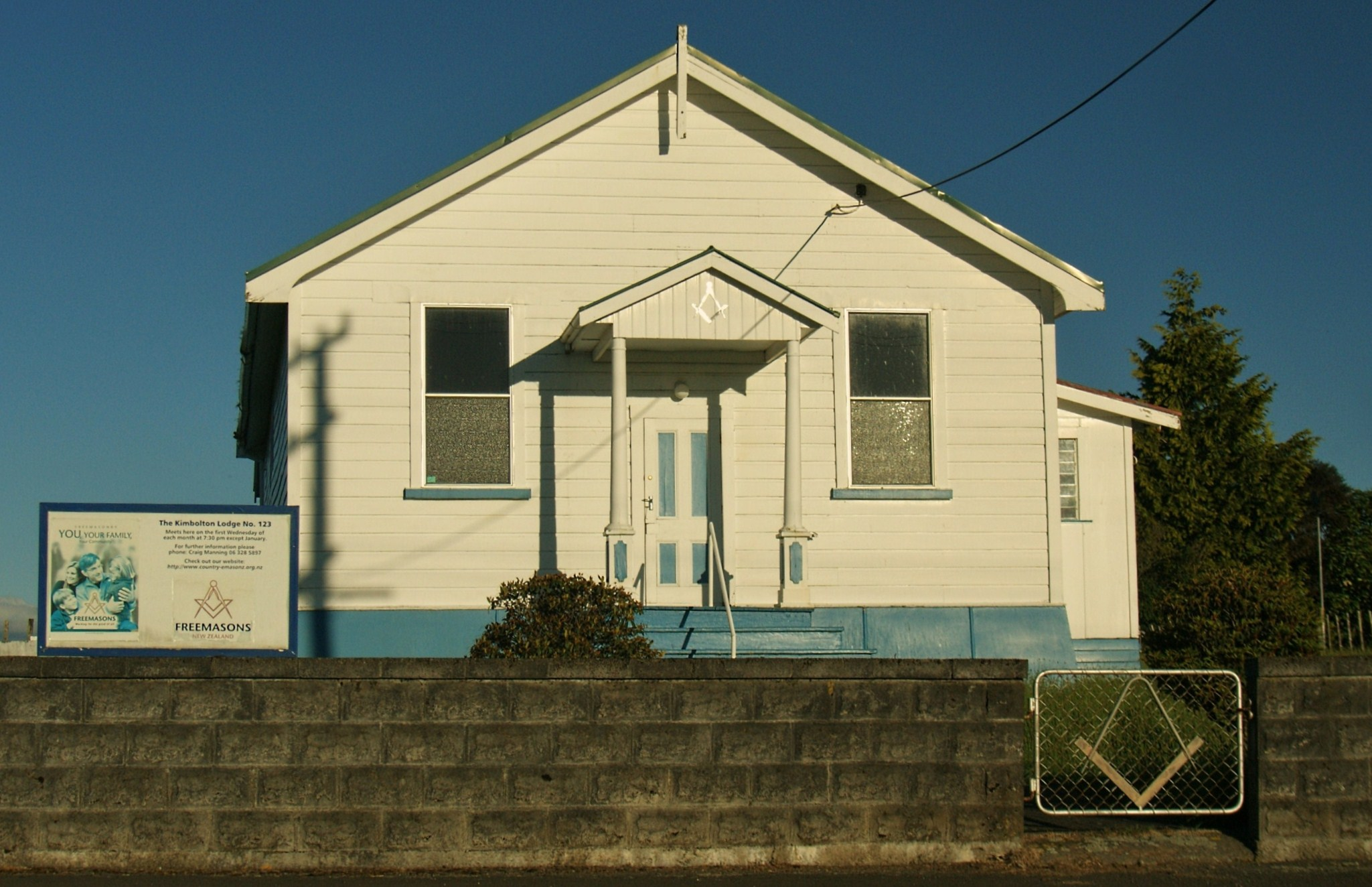
A typical Masonic Lodge

Freemasonry is a fraternal organization with its origins in the eighteenth century whose membership is held together by a shared set of moral and metaphysical ideals based on short role play narratives concerning the construction of King Solomon's Temple. Freemasons meet as a Lodge. Lodges meet in a Masonic Temple (in reference to King Solomon's Temple), Masonic Center or a Masonic Hall, such as Freemasons' Hall, London. Some confusion exists as Masons usually refer to a Lodge meeting as being in Lodge.

== Others ==
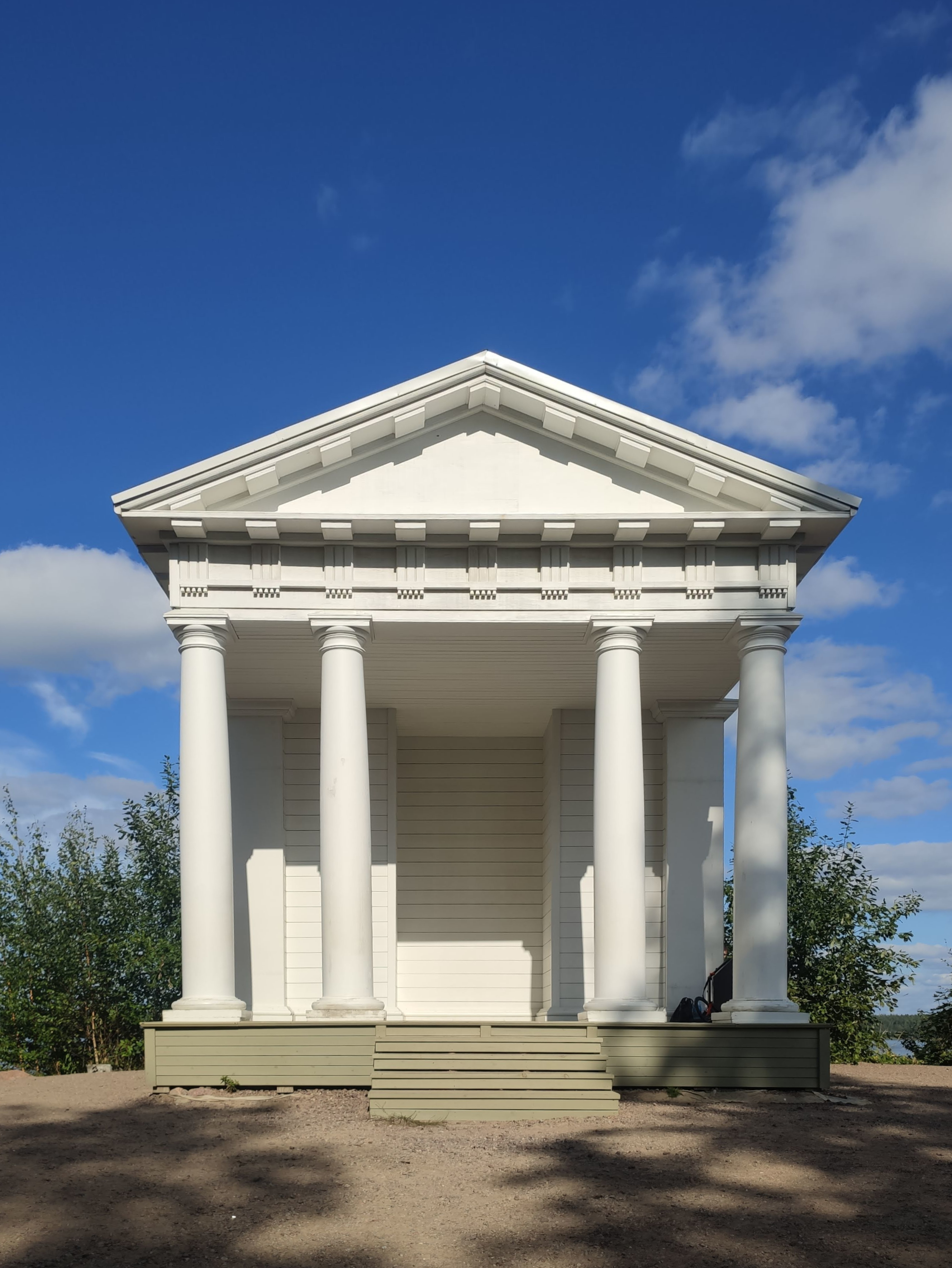
The Temple of Neptune at the Monrepos Park in Vyborg, Russia

- Göbekli Tepe, located in southern Turkey, was built between the 8th and 10th millennium BCE. Its circular compounds on top of a tell are composed by massive T-shaped stone pillars decorated with abstract, enigmatic pictograms and animal reliefs.
- Temples of Sheikh, ancient temples in Sheikh, Somaliland
- Temple of Yeha, the oldest standing structure in Yeha, Ethiopia; built around 700 BCE
- In the Star Wars films, the Jedi Temple is located on Coruscant.
- Wolmyeongdong Natural Temple, located in South Korea, was developed beginning in 1990 and continues to this day.
- Pashupatinath is one of the most famous temples of Hinduism, which is located at Kathmandu, Nepal.

Convention sometimes allows the use of temple in some of the following cases:

- Baháʼí Faith temple (Mashriqu'l-Adhkárs or 'Houses of Worship').
- Traditional Chinese folk shrines are called miao, or ancestral hall in English. Joss house is an obsolete American term for such kind of places of worship.
- Candomblé temples are called terreiros, literally "unpaved square" or "gathering place" in Portuguese.
- Confucian temple
- Mankhim, the temple of the ethnic group the Rai, located at Aritar, Sikkim.
- Shinto jinja are normally called shrines in English in order to distinguish them from Buddhist temples (-tera, -dera).
- Due to its long history, Taoist temples and monasteries are referred to by a diverse range of untranslated name variants listed in the Taoist temple article.

== See also ==
- Balinese temple
- Candi of Indonesia
- Chinese pagoda
- Chinese temple
- Dravidian architecture
- Romano-Celtic temple
- Jangam
- List of temples of Tamil Nadu
- Mandi (Mandaeism)
- Mosque
- National Temple of Divine Providence
- Place of worship
- Temple of Reason
- Jyotirlinga
- Shakta pithas
