= Castell, Texas =

- Location within Texas Location within the United States
- Coordinates: 30°42′04″N 98°57′23″W
- Country: United States
- State: Texas
- County: Llano
- Elevation: 1,201 ft (366 m)
- Time zone: UTC-6 (Central (CST))
  - Summer (DST): UTC-5 (CDT)
- Area code: 325
- FIPS code: 48-13240
- GNIS feature ID: 1379514

Castell (/kæˈstɛl/ ka-STEL) is a small, unincorporated, rural town in Llano County, Texas, United States. It is part of the Texas German belt region, and most residents are still ethnic German-Texan. Its population was 104 at the 2010 census. Located in the heart of the Texas Hill Country, its northern border is formed by the Llano River. It was designated a Recorded Texas Historic Landmark in 1964, marker number 9440.

== Founding ==
Castell began in 1847 as a land grant in Comanche territory settled by German immigrants. The unsettled land had formerly been part of the Fisher–Miller Land Grant.

It was part of a series of immigrant settlements sponsored by a group of prominent Germans known as the Adelsverein, including Baron Emil von Kriewitz, John O. Meusebach, Prince Carl of Solms-Braunfels, Hermann Spiess, Gustav Schleicher, Ferdinand Ludwig Herff, and Count Carl Frederick Christion of Castell-Castell (1801–1850). Count Castell was the vice president and business manager from the beginning of the Adelsverein until about the time of Castell's founding. The other communities were Schoenburg, Meerholz, Leiningen, and Bettina. The first two were unsuccessful from the start. Leiningen and Bettina had brief lives, with Bettina lasting only a year. Only Castell remains in Llano County.

Describing conditions in Castell in the mid-19th century, a tour guide has written

Life here was not easy. For the first couple of years, Castellites depended heavily on supplies and support from the people of Fredericksburg, who had problems enough of their own. A round trip to Fredericksburg—about 50 miles—took 4 days.

== Mormonism ==
Castell briefly experienced an influx of about 20 Mormon pioneer families under the leadership of Lyman Wight. They had settled in Zodiac, Texas, in 1847, in Mormon Mill in 1851, and then settled in Castell briefly before moving south in 1854 to Bandera, Texas. Wight died on March 31, 1858, and his body was returned to Zodiac for burial. Due to the Mormon custom of sending out missionaries, the Castellite congregations of 19th-century North Carolina possibly took their name from the Mormons who lived briefly in Castell, Texas.

== Modern era ==
The community was originally on the north bank of the Llano River, but now is on the south bank in the western part of Llano County near the Mason County line.

Castell had a population of 72 people in 1972 and again in 2000. In 2007, a Castell promotional site claimed a population of only 23.

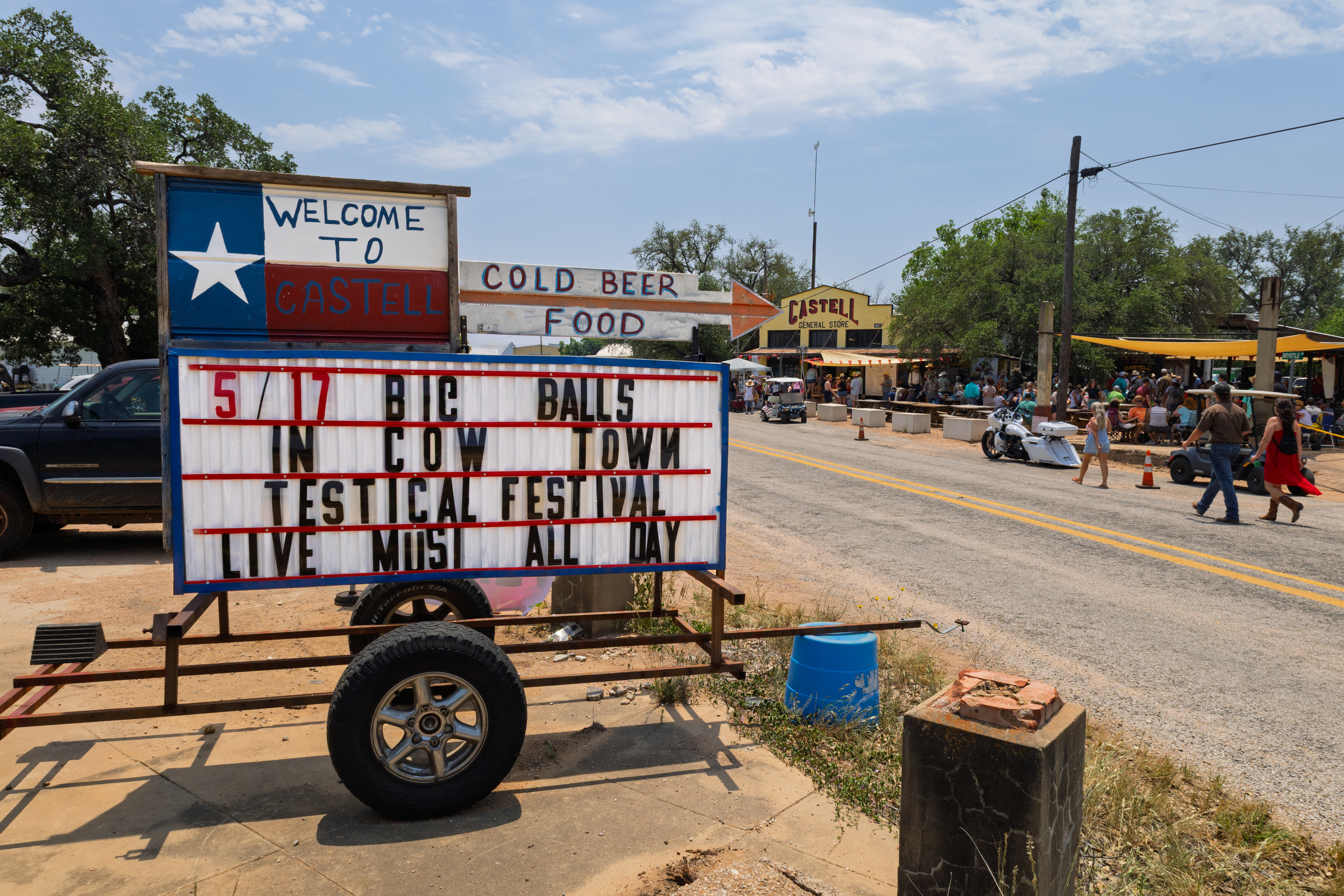
A sign in Castell, TX promoting the annual Testicle Festival, held at the historic Castell General Store

Castell is in the Central Time Zone and is assigned ZIP code 76831 and area code 325.

Castell has several small businesses, mainly centering on camping and hospitality as a result of the flyfishing and kayaking opportunities there.

Each May, the historic Castell General Store hosts the Testicle Festival. The festival is centered around calf fries and live music.

== Climate ==
The climate in this area is characterized by hot, humid summers and generally mild to cool winters. According to the Köppen climate classification system, Castell has a humid subtropical climate, Cfa on climate maps.

== Notable person ==
- Emil Kriewitz lived with the Penateka Comanche and served as guide for Fisher-Miller Land Grant settlers. He was the Llano County justice of the peace in 1870, Llano County election judge in 1871, and served as postmaster of Castell from 1876 to 1883. He was buried in the Llano City Cemetery.
