= Mormon Mill, Burnet County, Texas =

Mormon Mill, Texas
- Location within the state of Texas
- Coordinates: 30°38′13″N 98°14′02″W
- Country: United States
- State: Texas
- County: Burnet
- Elevation: 814 ft (248 m)
- Time zone: UTC-6 (Central (CST))
  - Summer (DST): UTC-5 (CDT)
- Area code: 512
- FIPS code: 48
- GNIS feature ID: 1363151

Mormon Mill is a vanished Mormon colony established in 1851 on Hamilton Creek in Burnet County, in the U.S. state of Texas. The site is located on Mormon Mills Road 5 miles (8.0 km) north of Marble Falls and 10 miles (16 km) south of Burnet. Mormon Mill has also been known as Mormon Mills, Mormon Mill Colony and Mormon Mill Historical Site. Designated a Recorded Texas Historic Landmark in 1936, Marker number 9733. The population moved to another county in 1853, and no buildings remain of the colony.

== The settlement ==
Upon leaving Zodiac in Gillespie County in 1851, Lyman Wight led a group which settled at Hamilton Creek to establish their new colony. As they had at Zodiac, the colonists set up mills for flour, grist, lumber and cotton, along with their furniture factories. One of their achievements was a three-story mill and 26 feet (7.9 m) water wheel by a wooden dam they had erected on the creek. Self-sustaining, while also supplying needed goods and services to nearby communities, the colonists engaged in agriculture, the blacksmith and furniture trades, as well as basketry and clothing manufacturing. Forty-five of the colonists signed the 1851 petition to create Burnet County.

In Burnet County, the Mormons suffered religious persecution, lived in fear of Indian depredations, and found themselves in financial debt. Wight decided to move the group elsewhere, and sold the property to Noah Smithwick. Some of the Mormons remained in Burnet County to work at the mill. Smithwick opened a store and a school for the remaining Mormons, and made mill modifications to encourage use by local farmers. In December 1853 Wight and his followers moved to Bandera County, establishing Mormon Camp in March 1854. While working to establish Mormon Camp, Wight died and was returned to Zodiac for burial. Mormon Camp is now located beneath the man-made Medina Lake in Bandera County.

== Decline ==
Noah Smithwick eventually sold Mormon Mill to his nephew John R. Hubbard. A post office was established on May 23, 1856, with Hubbard as the first postmaster. The post office had four postmasters before being discontinued on April 10, 1860, only to be re-established May 17, 1860, with Joshua H. Eubank as postmaster. The post office was again discontinued January 20, 1869, but re-established June 6, 1870 with Louis Thomas as postmaster. It was then discontinued October 3, 1871, but re-established November 13, 1871, with Louis Winter as postmaster. The post office was discontinued permanently May 6, 1875. The mill had several owners, and the population declined after the post office closed for the last time in 1875. The mill closed permanently in 1901, and most of the structures either later burned down, or the materials recycled elsewhere.

== See also ==
- Bandera, Texas
- Castell, Texas
