= Lyman Wight =

Latter Day Saint movement leader

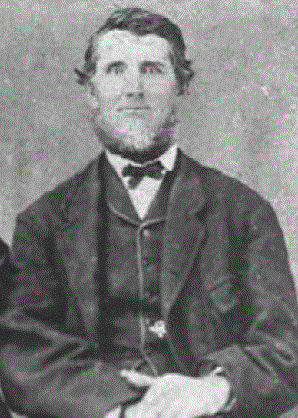

President of the Church of Christ
- 1844 – 1858
- Predecessor: Joseph Smith
- Successor: None
- Reason: Succession crisis

Quorum of the Twelve Apostles
- April 8, 1841 – December 3, 1848
- Called by: Joseph Smith
- End reason: Excommunicated for apostasy

Latter Day Saint Apostle
- April 8, 1841 – December 3, 1848
- Called by: Joseph Smith
- Reason: Replenishing Quorum of the Twelve
- End reason: Excommunicated for apostasy
- Reorganization at end of term: Charles C. Rich, Lorenzo Snow, Erastus Snow, and Franklin D. Richards ordained

Personal details
- Born: May 9, 1796; Fairfield, New York, United States
- Died: March 31, 1858 (aged 61); Mountain Valley, Texas, United States

Lyman Wight (May 9, 1796 – March 31, 1858) was an early leader in the Latter Day Saint movement. He was the leader of the Latter Day Saints in Daviess County, Missouri, in 1838. In 1841, he was ordained a member of the Quorum of the Twelve Apostles. After the death of Joseph Smith resulted in a succession crisis, Wight led his own break-off group of Latter Day Saints to Texas, where they created a settlement. While in Texas, Wight broke with the main body of the group led by Brigham Young. Wight was ordained president of his own church, but he later sided with the claims of William Smith, and eventually of Joseph Smith III. After his death, most of the "Wightites" (as members of this church were called) joined with the Reorganized Church of Jesus Christ of Latter Day Saints (RLDS Church).

== Early life ==
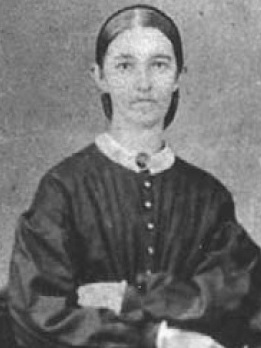
Harriet (Benton) Wight

Lyman Wight was born to Levi Wight and Sarah Corton on May 9, 1796, in Fairfield, New York. He fought in the War of 1812. On January 5, 1823, he married Harriet Benton in Henrietta, New York. Sometime around 1826, Wight moved to Warrensville Township, Ohio, and was baptized into the Reformed Baptist (later Disciples of Christ or Campbellite) faith by Sidney Rigdon in May 1829. In February 1830, Wight united with Isaac Morley and others in forming a common stock utopian society in Kirtland, Ohio. He eventually married four wives and had eleven children.

== Service in the church ==
Wight was baptized a member of the Church of Christ by Oliver Cowdery on November 14, 1830. He was ordained to the high priesthood in June 1831 by Joseph Smith Jr. and was tasked with traveling from Kirtland to Missouri with John Corrill, preaching along the way. He also ordained Joseph Smith Jr., Joseph Smith Sr., Sidney Rigdon, and many others at this time to the high priesthood. He stated he had seen Jesus Christ. Shortly afterwards, Wight went to Missouri, and later Cincinnati, Ohio, to preach, where he baptized over 100 people. Wight served eleven missions as a member of the church.

=== Jackson County conflict and Zion's Camp ===
With many of his converts, Wight went to settle in Independence, Missouri, to build the "City of Zion". The Mormons in Jackson County were at odds with their non-Mormon neighbors, who resorted to vigilantism to drive the church from the county.

On July 23, 1833, Wight signed an agreement with the vigilantes which specified that the Latter Day Saints would leave Jackson County by 1834. The Saints were driven out anyway into neighboring Clay County. The church membership called on several elders to go up to Kirtland to tell Joseph Smith about the events. When the elders refused, Wight stepped forward to make the journey, despite his wife being ill with a three-day-old child and only three days of food. Parley P. Pratt volunteered to go with Wight.

Wight and Pratt arrived in Kirtland, Ohio, on February 22, 1834. Two days later, they testified about the conflict in Missouri to the newly formed high council. This led to the organization of Zion's Camp. Smith sent out men, two by two, to recruit volunteers. Wight left on April 21 with Hyrum Smith to recruit from the northwestern United States. Recruitment was difficult, as many people did not want to leave their homes to defend others in Missouri. Smith and Wight recruited about twenty individuals, including Hosea Stout, who was not a church member at the time but was impressed with their preaching. They met with the main company on June 8 at the Salt River in Missouri, bringing the total to 207 men, 11 women, 11 children, and 25 wagons.

Wight tolerated the conditions of the company—including the eating of moldy and rancid food—under the promises from Joseph Smith that they would not be afflicted by it. After a 900-mile march, the members of the camp reached Missouri where they were smitten with cholera. They were then discharged without having accomplished their goal of returning the Latter Day Saints to Jackson County. At the end of Zion's Camp, Wight wrote up the discharge orders, and remained in Missouri according to Smith's request.

=== Itinerant preaching ===
For the remainder of 1834, Wight worked making bricks in Missouri, and built a large brick house for Colonel Arthur of Clay County, employing several others, including Wilford Woodruff.

In 1835, Wight was encouraged to travel to the temple at Kirtland. While on the journey, he preached. He stopped by Richmond, Indiana. He knew that people in the area were antagonistic towards the Mormons, yet he made an appointment to preach at the courthouse. At the appointed time, he went to the courthouse. People with tar and feathers filled the room, ready to lynch him. The event is described thus:

He preached about two hours, reproving them most severely for their meanness, wickedness and mobocratic spirit. At the close of the meeting he said, "If there is a gentleman in this congregation, I wish he would invite me to stay with him overnight." Whereupon, a gentleman stepped forward and tendered him an invitation, which he willingly accepted. His host said, "Mr Wight, it is astonishing how you have become so well acquainted with the people here, for you have described them very correctly." He was kindly entertained and furnished with money in the morning to aid him on his journey.

=== Mormon leader in Daviess County ===
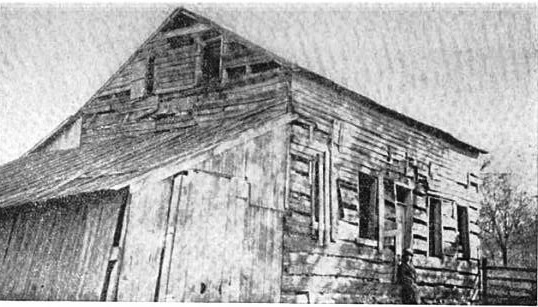
Residence of Lyman Wight at Adam-ondi-Ahman in 1838 (lean-to on the end of building is not part of the original residence)

Staying the winter in Kirtland, Wight set out to return to Missouri in 1836. In 1837, apostle David W. Patten accused him of teaching false doctrine, for which he was tried before the high council in Far West. Being found guilty, Wight made the necessary acknowledgments and apologies.

Settling near the Grand River in Daviess County, Missouri, on about February 1, 1838, Wight built a house and later a ferry which became known as "Wight's Ferry". On May 19, 1838, Joseph Smith paid a visit to Wight's home and ferry. It was from his house that Smith received a revelation about Adam-ondi-Ahman and foretold the future gathering there.

On June 28, 1838, at a conference of local church members, Smith organized a stake at Adam-ondi-Ahman, with his uncle John Smith as president, with Reynolds Cahoon and Wight as counselors. With the organization, members began settling in the area, including new members and refugees from Kirtland.

Wight had also become a Colonel in the 50th regiment of the Missouri Regiment, in the state militia, under the command of General H. G. Parks. By end of June, he was also head of the Danite organization in Daviess County. Between his several roles, Wight became the preeminent leader of the Latter Day Saints in the county.

=== The Mormon War ===
In the summer of 1838, the troubles of the Mormon War began with events on the Gallatin Election Day Battle. In response, Wight armed over 150 men at this time to defend the Latter Day Saints in Daviess County. Wight was accused, along with Joseph Smith, of organizing an army and threatening and harassing various old settlers of the county. Smith and Wight agreed to be tried in order to ease the tensions in the area. On September 7, 1838, they were presented before Judge Austin A. King, who ordered them to stand trial before the circuit court on bail of $500.

After the trial, emotions did not abate on either side. The Mormons and non-Mormons in Daviess County engaged in non-fatal conflicts. Non-Mormon vigilantes from other counties came to the county and began to harass the Latter Day Saints in outlying areas, burning their homes and looting their property. Refugees began pouring into Adam-ondi-Ahman, seeking protection. The Mormon response was to call up armed volunteers from Caldwell County. Combining with the Daviess men, the Mormons split into three groups and raided the chief non-Mormon settlements. Wight led the raid on Millport. The old settlers and their families fled and Wight and his men looted their property and burned their homes to the ground.

Following these actions, the Battle of Crooked River took place. Smith advised every church member to go to Adam-ondi-Ahman or Far West for protection and strength. When Far West fell under siege after the Missouri Executive Order 44, Wight organized members in Adam-ondi-Ahman to assist them. No battle took place, however, as Wight and the other Mormon leaders were arrested by the state militia and the Mormon militia subsequently surrendered.

While in custody of the state troops, Wight endured the mockery and vulgarity of the troops, lying in the ground in the rain. A court martial which might have led to Wight's execution was averted by General Alexander William Doniphan of Clay County, who challenged the legality of any such court. Instead, Wight and the other leaders were tried in the civil courts. Wight and other leaders were allowed to escape from jail during their transfer to Boone County on April 6, 1839.

=== Nauvoo era ===
Wight was ordained an apostle of the church by Smith on April 8, 1841, to replace Patten, who had died in the Battle of Crooked River in 1838. Wight and George Miller became co-responsible for a common-stock, religious cooperative company/church mill and logging town in the wilderness of Wisconsin. Much lumber for the Nauvoo Temple and the Nauvoo House were floated down the Mississippi River from the several Mormon mills in the area.

== Succession crisis and Wightite colony ==
=== Split with the LDS Church ===
During the succession crisis after Smith's death, Wight felt compelled to follow the orders Smith had given him to found a safe haven for the Latter Day Saints in the Republic of Texas. Brigham Young attempted several times to persuade Wight to join the main body of Latter-day Saints, which he had organized as the Church of Jesus Christ of Latter-day Saints in the Alta California area of Mexico, which would become the Utah Territory in 1850. However, Wight refused each time. He rejected Young as a prophet. Wight was eventually excommunicated by Young on December 3, 1848; his most prominent follower, Bishop George Miller, was also disfellowshipped.

=== Zodiac, Texas ===
Wight moved his group of Latter Day Saints to the Republic of Texas and he would eventually found several communities on the central Texas frontier. Wight's followers built the first Latter Day Saint temple west of the Mississippi. The temple was built in Zodiac, Texas, about three miles from Fredericksburg. Sealings, ordinations, washing and anointings, and adoptions were performed in this temple by the Wightites.

The only remaining material infrastructure of the colony is the Mormon Mill cemetery near Hamilton Creek, about fifty miles east by north of Fredericksburg.

=== President of the Church of Christ (Wightite) ===
Wight would later recognize William Smith as the president of the Latter Day Saints for a short time and served as a counselor in Smith's short-lived First Presidency. After 1849, Wight wrote and stated that he believed the prophetic mantle of church leadership should fall on the shoulders of Joseph Smith's sons. By then, Wight had rejected Brigham Young, William Smith, and James Strang as pretenders to be Smith's successor. In 1851, after the Pedernales River overflowed its banks and destroyed Zodiac, the Wightite colonists moved to Burnet County, establishing Mormon Mill.

== Death ==
Wight died on March 31, 1858, in Mountain Valley, Texas at the age of 61. He had been experiencing epileptic spasms. Wight had been living in Texas with a small remnant of his colony. His group had been traveling to Jackson County, Missouri, where he wished to rejoin the remainder of the mid-western Latter Day Saints. He was buried in his temple robes at the Mormon cemetery at Zodiac, which no longer exists. After Wight's death, most of his followers became members of the RLDS Church (renamed the Community of Christ in 2001), led by Joseph Smith III.

== See also ==
- Castell, Texas
- Castellites

== External resources ==
- Grampa Bill's G.A. Pages: Lyman Wight
- Lyman Wight, "Saints Without Haloes", Leonard J. Arrington and Davis Bitton. Signature Books.
- Lyman Wight's Mormon Colony in Texas excerpt from "Mormon Trails" chapter in Hill Country travel guide by Richard Zelade (2001). Accessed online August 6, 2007.
- Davis Bitton papers on Lyman Wight, 1849-1996, L. Tom Perry Special Collections
- Lyman Wight records of baptisms for the dead, L. Tom Perry Special Collections

Church of Jesus Christ of Latter Day Saints titles Later renamed: The Church of Jesus Christ of Latter-day Saints (1844)
Preceded by Willard Richards	Quorum of the Twelve Apostles; April 8, 1841 – 3 December 1848	Succeeded by Amasa M. Lyman
