= Zodiac, Texas =

- Location within Texas Location within the United States
- Coordinates: 30°13′29″N 98°47′37″W
- Country: United States
- State: Texas
- County: Gillespie
- Elevation: 1,594 ft (486 m)
- Time zone: UTC-6 (Central (CST))
  - Summer (DST): UTC-5 (CDT)
- Area code: 830
- FIPS code: 48
- GNIS feature ID: 1378977

Zodiac is a vanished Mormon settlement established in 1847 on the Pedernales River, located 4 miles (6.4 km) southeast of Fredericksburg, in Gillespie County, in the U.S. state of Texas. The area it was located on eventually converted to private acreage, and no trace of the settlement remains today. It was the first Mormon colony established by Lyman Wight in Texas. The second settlement was Mormon Mill in Burnet County in 1851, and his third and final settlement was Mormon Camp in 1854 in Bandera County. In 1936, Zodiac was designated a Recorded Texas Historic Landmark, Marker number 10133.

== History ==
=== Background ===
Wight led a group of 200 followers into Texas in 1845. The group first entered Texas at Grayson County, at a site known as Mormon Grove, where they spent the winter months before moving on during the spring thaw, arriving in Austin in June 1846. The Mormons hired themselves out as laborers to help build the city jail. After constructing a sawmill and gristmill on the Colorado River, the group migrated towards the Texas Hill Country.

=== Settlement ===
Wight received permission in 1847 from John O. Meusebach to settle a colony of Mormons within the Adelsverein territory. Core ideals of the Germans that favored religious tolerance and disfavored the institution of slavery made this particular German community look inviting to Wight. Upon settling at a site on the Pedernales River in Gillespie County, Wight and his followers set about to erect the structures of their community. They built a chapel, school, store, gristmill, and sawmill. The Mormon business enterprises helped supply the needs of the county as a whole. In 1848, Wight and his followers helped build Fort Martin Scott.

United States boundary commissioner John Russell Bartlett had been charged to carry out the provisions of the Treaty of Guadalupe Hidalgo. Bartlett visited Zodiac in 1850 and gave an account of community life:

Everywhere around us in this Zodiacal settlement, we see abundant signs of prosperity... They have a tract of land which they have cultivated for about three years and which has yielded profitable crops. The well-built houses, perfect fences and tidy dooryards give the place a homelike air such as we had not seen before in Texas. The dinner was a regular old-fashioned New England farmer's meal comprised of an abundance of everything and served with faultless neatness. The entire charge for the dinner for twelve persons and corn for as many animals was $3.

In 1851, the Pedernales River overflowed its banks and destroyed the Mormon mills. Wight and the others pulled up stakes and moved to Mormon Mill in Burnet County. They retained the rights to the Zodiac cemetery in Gillespie, where several of their flock had already been buried. Lyman Wight died eight miles from San Antonio on March 31, 1858, and was returned to Zodiac Cemetery for burial.

After the departure of the Mormons, the area saw a succession of Germans, English and Danish colonists. Before and during the Civil War the area formerly known as Zodiac became a slave labor cotton farm, purportedly the only slave labor cotton plantation in Gillespie County. If that claim is accurate, this is possibly the property on which future Texas State Senator Matthew Gaines was forced to work as a runaway slave during the Civil War. In the 1860 census, Gillespie County had thirty-three slaves.

The Rocky Hill school was built in 1885, and Zodiac was renamed for the school. The cemetery was plowed over and destroyed. The area is located on private property.

== See also ==
- Bandera, Texas
- Castell, Texas
