= Texas State Historical Association =

American nonprofit educational organization

- Legal status: Non-profit
- Purpose: Promoting and preserving the history of Texas
- Headquarters: Austin, Texas, U.S.
- Origins: March 2, 1897
- Website: tshaonline.org

The Texas State Historical Association (TSHA) is an American nonprofit educational and research organization dedicated to documenting the history of Texas. It was founded in Austin, Texas, United States, on March 2, 1897. In November 2008, the TSHA moved its offices from Austin to the University of North Texas in Denton, Texas. In 2015, the offices were relocated again to the University of Texas at Austin.

== History ==
On February 13, 1897, ten persons convened to discuss the creation of a nonprofit to promote Texas state history. George Pierce Garrison, chair of the University of Texas history department, led the organizational meeting establishing the association on March 2, 1893. The TSHA elected Oran Milo Roberts as its first president. In addition to Roberts, TSHA charter members included Guy M. Bryan, Anna Pennybacker, Bride Neill Taylor, and Dudley G. Wooten. About twenty or thirty persons attended the charter meeting. One of the founders was John Henninger Reagan.

This first formal meeting of the TSHA included men and several women who became charter members.

At this first meeting, George P. Garrison advocated that archival material about Texas needed to be preserved. Officers were chosen during the meeting, and controversy over what John Salmon Ford called "lady members" caused Ford to storm out of the meeting. Ford wanted to amend the TSHA constitution to replace "members" with "lady members" when the participants were women. Garrison opposed the change, and eventually Taylor spoke up and agreed that there was no need to change anything. Ford could not be placated and after yelling at Taylor, "Madam, your brass may get you into the association, but you will never have the right to get in under that section as it stands," his amendment to create "lady members" was unanimously defeated by the others at the meeting. The other charter members viewed Ford's departure as detrimental, counting on his political influence to help support the group.

The first president was Oran Milo Roberts, with Wooten, Bryan, Julia Lee Sinks, and Charles Corner elected as vice presidents. Membership dues were $2 a year in 1897.

The TSHA held annual meetings in Austin. The first annual meeting was held on June 17, 1897. Topics included "The Expulsion of the Cherokees From East Texas, "The Last Survivor of the Goliad Massacre," "The Veramendt House," "Thomson's Clandestine Passage Around Nacogdoches," and "Defunct Counties of Texas." There was also a group business meeting.

By 1928, the TSHA had 500 members.

== Notable members ==
- Ben H. Procter, president from 1979 to 1980
- Merline Pitre, president from 2011 to 2012
- Hally Ballinger Bryan Perry
- Florence Warfield Sillers

=== Publications ===
The organization produces four educational publications:

- New Handbook of Texas, a six-volume multidisciplinary encyclopedia of Texas history, culture, and geography. In addition, the Handbook of Texas Online is provided by the TSHA for historical internet research of Texas.
- The Southwestern Historical Quarterly (initially the Quarterly of the Texas State Historical Association) is the oldest continuously published scholarly journal in Texas. The journal features 16 articles per year, covering topics in a range of appeal.
- Riding Line is a quarterly newsletter featuring news and current information on state historical activities.
- The Texas Almanac is a biennially published reference work providing information for the general public on the history of the state and its people, government and politics, economics, natural resources, holidays, culture, education, recreation, the arts, and other topics. The TSHA acquired the Texas Almanac as a gift from the A. H. Belo Corporation on May 5, 2008.

== Educational programs ==
- Educational Department: Founded in 1939, it promotes the teaching of Texas history in the state's schools.
- Junior Historians of Texas: An extracurricular program for students in grades four through twelve.
- Texas History Day: Provides an opportunity for students to develop their knowledge of history in an annual state-level history fair for students in grades six through twelve.
- History Awareness Workshops: Helps educators develop teaching strategies for informative content and practical classroom applications.
- Heritage Travel Program: a one-week traveling seminar dealing with a specific subject in Texas history held in the summer

== See also ==
- West Texas Historical Association, based in Lubbock, Texas
- List of historical societies in Texas
