= Fredericksburg Historic District =

Fredericksburg Historic District may refer to:

- Fredericksburg Historic District (Texas), listed on the National Register of Historic Places in Gillespie County, Texas
- Fredericksburg Historic District (Virginia), listed on the National Register of Historic Places in Fredericksburg, Virginia
