= Architecture of Fredericksburg, Texas =

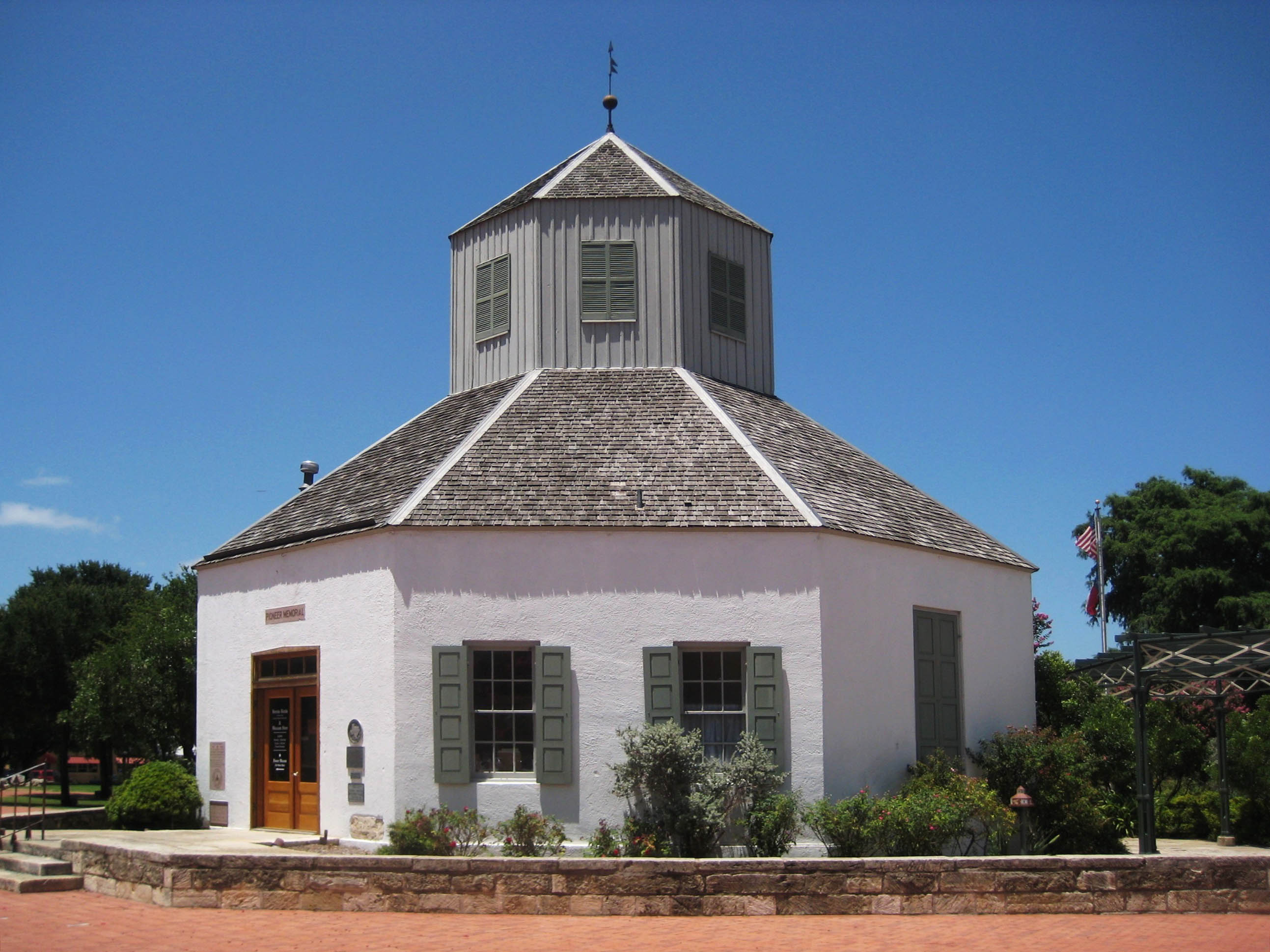
Fredericksburg Vereins Kirche

The architectural structures of Fredericksburg, Texas, are often unique to the Texas Hill Country, and are historical edifices of the German immigrants who settled the area in the 19th century. Many of the structures have historic designations on a state or national level. The Gillespie County Historical Society is actively involved in assisting with preservation.

On October 14, 1970, the Fredericksburg Historic District was added to the National Register of Historic Places in Texas.

== Sunday Houses ==
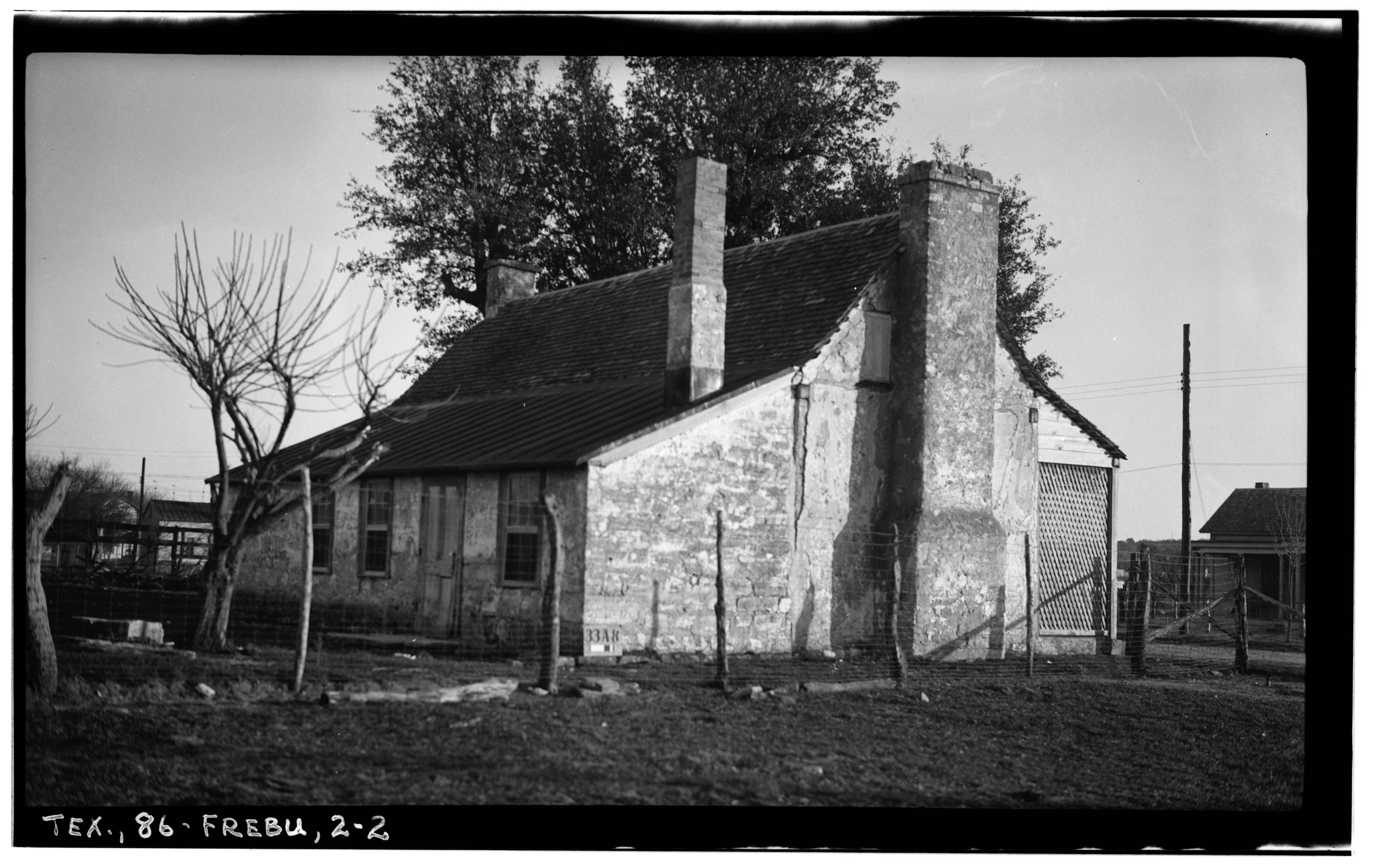
Staudt Sunday House

The Sunday Houses are unique to the German immigrant culture of the Texas Hill Country. In reverse of the old European tradition of living in town while working the rural farms, the early Fredericksburg German settlers made their main homes on the acreage they worked. On their town lots, they erected Sunday Houses for overnight stays on their weekly travels into town for supplies and church attendance. Older generations would use the houses as a retirement house, as the younger generations inherited the acreage and the work. These houses were often made of limestone rock coated with whitewash inside and out. Depending on the individual family's need, these relatively small houses were designed for limited stays, with one or two ground floor rooms and an upper loft for sleeping. Standard design was a fireplace and a porch. Often there was an outside staircase leading to the loft. Many of these homes in Fredericksburg have been restored, with some of them being used as bed-and-breakfast retreats.

== Pioneer Museum Complex ==
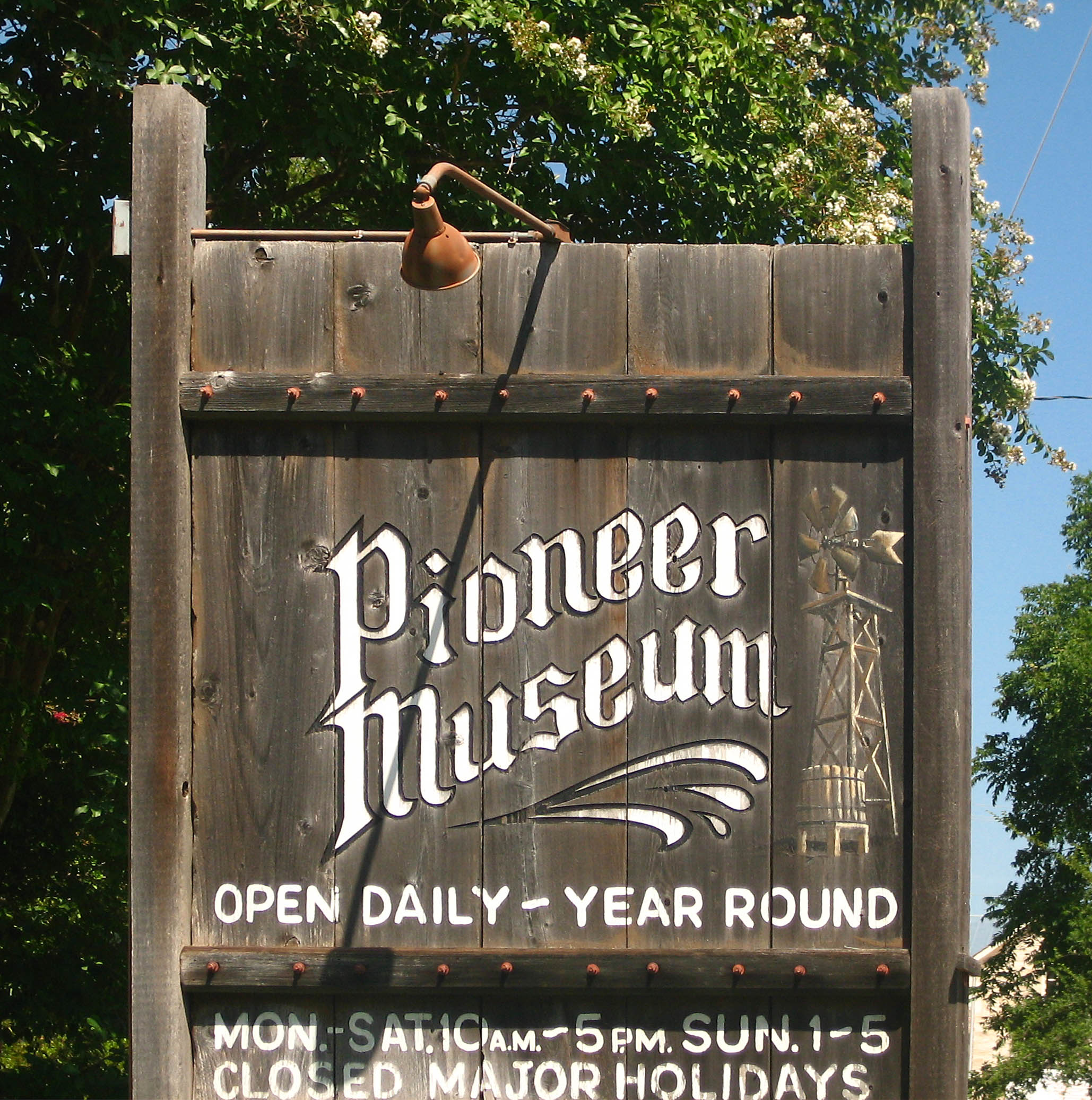
Pioneer Village Museum in Fredericksburg occupied a new headquarters building in 2008.

The Pioneer Museum Complex is located at 325 W Main Street. The 3.5 acre complex includes a museum and historical buildings.

=== The Vereins Kirche ===
30°16′49″N 98°52′53″W

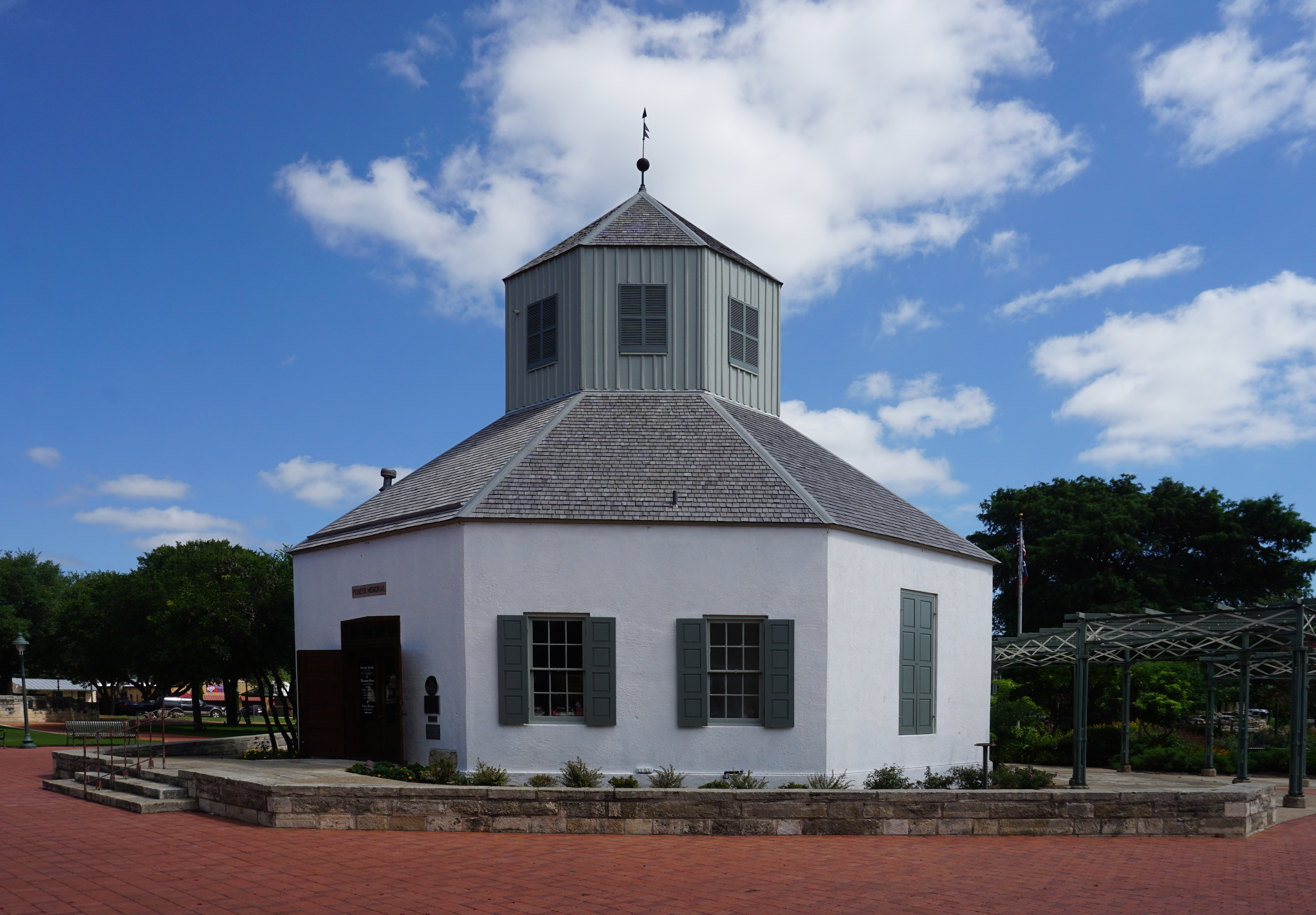
Vereins Kirche

Marktplatz surrounds the Vereins Kirche, designated a recorded Texas Historic Landmark in 1967, marker number 10123. The Vereins Kirche, or Peoples Church, was designed by Friedrich Schubbert (aka Friedrich Armand Strubberg) and became the first public building in Fredericksburg in 1847. It served as a nondenominational church, school, town hall, and fort. Locals refer to it as the Kaffeemühle (The Coffee Mill) Church for its shape. Pupils learned their lessons in their own German language, and their parents paid $1 per quarter in tuition for each child. The first teacher in the Vereins-Kirche in 1847 was Professor Johann (John) Leyendecker, who emigrated from Rhineland-Palatinate with his wife and five children. They sailed on the ship Riga, which left Antwerp on November 7, 1845, and arrived in Galveston on February 1, 1846. Leyendecker also provided his home for Catholic services. Leyendecker was succeeded as the Vereins Kirche teacher in 1848 by Jacob Brodbeck. The building models a style known as Carolingian architecture, similar to the Aachen Cathedral. Each side of the octagon was 18 feet (5.5 m) wide by 18 feet (5.5 m) high, with each side having a roof 10 feet (3.0 m) high, topped by a 7-foot (2.1 m) high octagonal cupola. A rooster weather vane that sat on top was destroyed by lightning and replaced by a cross. In 1896 (or 1897) the original building was torn down. The Vereins Kirche was rebuilt in 1936, using the cornerstone from the original building.

=== Arhelger Bathhouse ===
The Arhelger Bathhouse operated from 1910 to 1930 for travelers; it was donated by Kenneth and JoAnn Kothe in 1995.

=== Dambach-Besier House ===
30°16′39″N 98°52′33″W
Designated a Recorded Texas Historic Landmark in 1985, Marker number 10026.

515 E. Main

The 1869 limestone Dambach-Besier House serves as the West End Visitor Center for the Fredericksburg Convention and Visitors Bureau Welcome Center. The house originally sat on a lot which cost F. Dambach $70 in 1867. Widow Anna Besier acquired the property in 1881 and moved there so her children could attend school in town. She sold dairy products from the milk cows she kept across the street. Donated in 2005 by Kenneth and JoAnn Kothe, the house was disassembled, moved, and reconstructed at its current location.

=== Fassel-Roeder House ===
The Fassel-Roeder House began as a butcher shop in 1876, with living quarters added later. The centerpiece of the house is a coin-operated music box from Leipzig.

=== Fredericksburg Volunteer Fire Department Museum ===
The Fredericksburg Volunteer Fire Department Museum displays fire fighting equipment from the early 20th century. The Fredericksburg Volunteer Fire Department was begun in 1883 by the Turn Verein organization.

=== Kammlah House ===
30°16′19″N 98°51′09″W
309–315 W. Main Street

The 1849 Kammlah House, designated a recorded Texas Historic Landmark in 1966, marker number 10064, was purchased by the Gillespie County Historical Society from the Kammlah family in 1955. This house was originally a one-room structure with stone floors and stone hearth, wall plaster over woven twig supports used in interior, and enlarged over the years by the Kammlahs, who operated the house as a general store for over 50 years. A barn and smokehouse are part of the property.

=== Walton-Smith Log Cabin ===
The 1880s Walton-Smith Log Cabin is a small log, stone, and mortar 300-square-foot (28 m^{2}) cabin with a one-room frame addition, built by John and Nancy Walton. It was moved and rebuilt at its current location in 1985 by Cox Restoration.

=== Weber Sunday House ===
The Weber Sunday House was built by August Weber in 1904, with no electricity or running water, for the family's weekly 7-mile (11 km) trips into town.

=== White Oak School ===
The White Oak School is a one-room country schoolhouse which accommodated students in grades one through eight and was built in the 1920s. Teachers were required to speak both English and German, and the first teacher A.D. Fischer earned $30 a month. Financial support for the teacher and school was provided by a flat annual fee, plus an additional monthly stipend per student. Donated by Mr. and Mrs. Charles Feller.

== Joseph Wilson and Ruth Ament Huffman Baines House ==
30°16′54″N 98°52′44″W
Designated a recorded Texas Historic Landmark in 2002, marker number 12975, the house at 102 W. College St was built in 1904 by the maternal grandparents of Lyndon B. Johnson: Joseph Wilson Baines (1846–1906) and Ruth Ament Huffman Baines (1854–1936). They constructed the exterior of the house out of prefabricated concrete blocks made locally by Basse Blocks.

== Bank of Fredericksburg ==
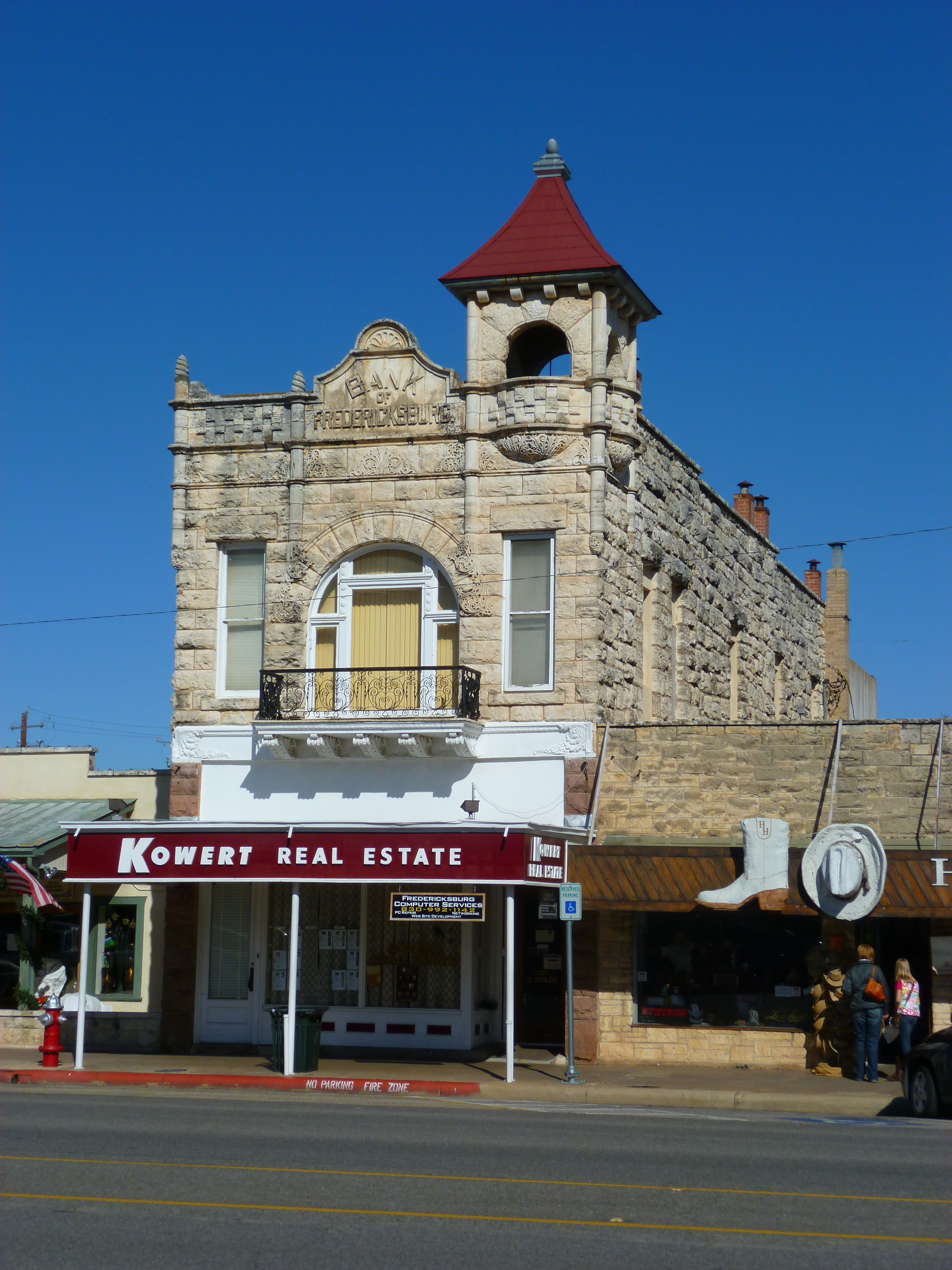
Bank of Fredericksburg

30°16′30″N 98°52′08″W

120 E. Main Street

The Richardsonian Romanesque style bank building was designed in 1889 by architect Alfred Giles. He also designed two other structures in Fredericksburg, the old courthouse now known as the Fredericksburg Memorial Library, and the William Bierschwale house on Bowie Street. A fourth design by Giles is the 1893 Morris Ranch Schoolhouse at Morris Ranch in Gillespie County.

== Christian Crenwelge Place ==
30°16′26″N 98°52′39″W
Designated a recorded Texas Historic Landmark in 1979, marker number 10023, the house at 312 W. Schubert is a Victorian-style Sunday House constructed in 1902. In 1872, German farmer and cabinetmaker Christian Crenwelge bought the property at a sheriff's sale, and temporarily operated a molasses factory here before building the home on the property.

== Dangers Stone House ==
30°16′57″N 98°52′19″W
Designated a Recorded Texas Historic Landmark in 1974, Marker number 10027.

213 W. Creek Street

The Rev. Gottlieb Burchard Dangers arrived from Germany on June 20, 1845, on the ship Johann Dethardt. He moved to Fredericksburg in 1849, becoming the second Protestant minister in town. Rev. Dangers constructed this fachwerk house in 1851. An additional two rooms and a cellar were added later.

== Domino Parlor ==
30°16′28″N 98°52′22″W
Designated a recorded Texas Historic Landmark in 1980, marker number 10029, the stone structure business establishment at 222 E. Main Street, with its vaulted ceiling and cellar, was built in the early 1850s by John Schmidtzinsky. When H.R. Richter had a jewelry store and music store in the building, he held concerts in the front room. The building has also been home to the Domino Parlor restaurant.

== Fredericksburg College Building ==
30°16′11″N 98°52′25″W
Designated a recorded Texas Historic Landmark in 1971, marker number 10040, the building at 108 W. Travis Street was erected and organized in 1874 by the German Methodist Mission Conference of Texas and Louisiana -Methodist Episcopal Church, South. The hand-cut stone building housed an institute of higher learning which operated 1876–1884 and had 250 students at its peak.

== Fredericksburg Social Turn Verein (Turner Hall) ==
30°16′40″N 98°52′10″W
Designated a Recorded Texas Historic Landmark in 1994, Marker number 10043.

103 W. Travis

The Turnvereins, or athletic clubs, were begun in Germany by Friedrich Ludwig Jahn in 1811, and were brought to the United States by the Forty-Eighters political refugees. In Texas, it became two words, Turn Verein, and served as social, political and athletic centers. The German founders of the clubs in Texas were usually civic leaders, teachers, scientists and artists. Turners helped popularize bowling in the United States, advocated physical education and fitness, and lobbied local school boards for the inclusion of physical education classes in the curriculum. The Fredericksburg Social Turn Verein was established in 1871, with a gymnastics school and a 9-pin bowling alley. In 1872 the club began annual Christmas celebrations. The Turners instituted the City Volunteer Fire Department in 1883. The Fredericksburg Social Turn Verein moved to 103 W. Travis Street in 1909, and remains active as one of the city's oldest continuing organizations.

== Gillespie County 1885 Jailhouse ==
30°16′23″N 98°52′27″W

Located at 117 San Antonio Street and designated a recorded Texas Historic Landmark in 1980, marker number 10021, Gillespie County's first jail was a 14 ft (4.3 m) by 14 ft (4.3 m) building erected in 1852. John Raegner and John Walch constructed the second jail out of stone and iron near the courthouse for $413.50. It measured 14 ft (4.3 m) by 18 ft (5.5 m). Ludwig Schmidt built the third jail in 1859 for $800. It measured 18 ft (5.5 m) by 30 ft (9.1 m), constructed out of stone, and had four rooms and a cellar. A fourth jailhouse was built in 1874, and burned down in 1885, with one fatality being a prisoner.

The 1885 jailhouse is often referred to as the fourth jail, but is in actuality the fifth. C. F. Priess and Brothers Builders were contracted to build the two-story limestone structure, and construction costs came in at $9,962. The ground floor served as a holding area, as well as living quarters for the jailer. The second floor had two steel-clad cells, and maximum-security cells.

When the new Gillespie County Courthouse was built in 1939, the jail was on the third floor. Currently, a free-standing structure is in place.

== Adolph Gold House ==
30°16′57″N 98°52′26″W

This house, at 212 E. Travis Street, was built in 1901 by Adolph Gold as part of an early subdivision; the house is constructed of native limestone and Basse Blocks. It was designated a recorded Texas Historic Landmark in 1990, marker number 10046.

== Gold-Grobe House ==
30°16′29″N 98°52′06″W
Designated a Recorded Texas Historic Landmark in 1989, Marker number 10047.

418 N. Llano Street

Peter Gold Sr. built the original one-story native limestone house in 1902. In 1914, Friedrich William Grobe purchased the house and added a second story with Basse Blocks.

== Gun Cap Factory ==
30°16′39″N 98°52′32″W
Designated a Recorded Texas Historic Landmark in 1964, Marker number 10050.

306 W. Main Street

Gunsmith Engelbert Krauskopf and silversmith Adolph Lungkwitz manufactured gun caps at this location during the Civil War.

== Carl Henke House ==
30°16′55″N 98°52′44″W
Designated a Recorded Texas Historic Landmark in 1978, Marker number 10052.

116 E. Travis Street

Carl Henke was born Fredericksburg in 1848 and is believed to be the first boy baby born to the new German colonists. In 1874, he built the original native limestone structure for John Schmidt, in Sunday House style with an outside stairway. Henke purchased the house from Schmidt in the 1880s, and added a west-wide wing in 1911.

== Keidel Memorial Hospital ==
30°16′24″N 98°52′10″W

254–258 E. Main

In 1909, Dr. Albert Keidel, son of Fredericksburg's first physician Dr. Wilhelm Victor Keidel, built Keidel Memorial Hospital. Albert Keidel died in 1914. Dr. Victor Keidel purchased the building in 1919, sold it in 1923 and bought it back in 1937. He adapted it to create the Keidel Memorial Hospital. The "Keidel Clinic" served the people of Fredericksburg until the larger and more modern Hill Country Memorial Hospital opened in 1971. The Keidel Memorial Hospital building now houses a Gourmet Kitchen Store, Der Kuchen Laden, owned by the granddaughter of Dr. Victor Keidel. Rathskeller restaurant is located in the basement space. Original furnishings of the building are cared for by Gillespie County Historical Society.

== Kiehne-Hermann Home ==
30°16′17″N 98°52′02″W
Designated a Recorded Texas Historic Landmark in 1976, Marker number 10065.

405 E. Main Street

German immigrant Frederick Kiehne built this hand-cut limestone, adobe brick and timber home in 1850. Kiehne was a local blacksmith and Gillespie County commissioner. He enlarged the house a decade later. Walter Foerster owned the house in the 1930s and made an additional enlargement. It was restored by Maria and Ronald Herrmann in the early 1970s.

== Kloth-Ludwig Home ==
30°14′26″N 98°52′25″W
Designated a Recorded Texas Historic Landmark in 1980, Marker number 10067.

414 E. Main Street

The native combination commercial-residential limestone building was constructed c. 1870 on property owned by John Adams Alberthal. Christian Kloth purchased the home in 1878. Upon his death in 1904, it was inherited by his daughters.

== Johann Joseph Knopp House ==
30°17′20″N 98°52′34″W
Designated a Recorded Texas Historic Landmark in 1971, Marker number 10066.

309 W. Schubert Street

On a site purchased for $70 in gold, Johann Knopp and his wife Katherina Stein Knopp built this native limestone house in 1871. The house was restored in 1939 and remodeled in 1968.

== Kuenemann House ==
30°16′42″N 98°52′46″W
Designated a Recorded Texas Historic Landmark in 1998, Marker number 11893.

413 W. Creek Street

Believed to have been built in 1846 by Heinrich Schupp. Frederick Kuenemann purchased this fachwerk house in 1866. Over the years, many additions and improvements were made by the Kuenemann family. By 1929, it was a private residence and nursing home.

== Loeffler-Weber House ==
30°16′04″N 98°52′09″W
Designated a Recorded Texas Historic Landmark in 1971, Marker number 10072.

508 W. Main Street

Log cabin built in 1846–47 by Gerhard Rorig. Noted cabinetmaker Johann Martin Loeffler added typical rock and half-timber rooms and cooking fireplace, 1867; his son-in-law, J. Charles Weber, in 1905 restored the southeast lean-to. Restored 1964 by Mr. and Mrs. George A. Hill, III Consultant: Albert Keidel, Architectural Designer.

== Maier-Alberthal House ==
30°16′34″N 98°51′06″W
Designated a Recorded Texas Historic Landmark in 1983, Marker number 10078.

324 E. Main Street

Believed to have been constructed c. 1860, Anton Maier bought the stone vernacular building in 1866. He deeded the building to his son-in-law August Alberthal. The building has housed various businesses – grocery store, general store, soda water factory, auto repair shop, and house of worship.

== Meckel-Hanus Building ==
30°16′50″N 98°52′00″W
Designated a Recorded Texas Historic Landmark in 1986, Marker number 10081.

302 E. Main Street

Believed to have been built as a one-story stone structure in 1860, Henry Meckel purchased the building in 1886. Meckel built a second story of Basse Blocks. Dr. J.J. Hanus bought the building in 1927 for a hospital, and altered the outer facade in 1929. From 1949 through 1979, it was a Catholic convent. Restored 1983 by Joe, Pat and Eric Vance.

== Meinhardt-Pfeil Home ==
30°16′50″N 98°52′00″W
Designated a Recorded Texas Historic Landmark in 1980, Marker number 10082.

125 W. San Antonio

Albert and Doris Meinhardt built the two-story native limestone home c. 1850. Upon Albert's death, Doris sold it to G. Adolph Pfeil, who operated a blacksmith ship and soda water factory from the structure.

== Moritz-Hitzfeld-Jacoby House ==
30°17′28″N 98°52′48″W
Designated a Recorded Texas Historic Landmark in 1987, Marker number 10085.

608 N. Milam

This Victorian native limestone house was built in 1907 for Edmund and Anna Moritz. The house was purchased by Levi and Caroline Hitzfeld in 1914. Felix and Emmy Jacoby purchased it in 1941.

== Mosel-Jordan-Duecker Haus ==
30°15′58″N 98°52′00″W
Designated a Recorded Texas Historic Landmark in 1986, Marker number 10087.

121 E. San Antonio

Johann Nicholas Mosel built a limestone structure, possibly as a Sunday House, on his 1847 grant from the German Immigration Company. August William Jordan bought the house in 1860. Henry Duecker bought the house to use as a Sunday House, and made frame additions.

== Mueller-Petmecky House ==
30°16′05″N 98°52′54″W
Designated a Recorded Texas Historic Landmark in 1983, Marker number 10083.

201 S. Washington

It is believed the original two-room fachwerk house was built between 1848 and 1850, by colonist Willis Wallace on land from the German Immigration Company. Heinrich Mueller Jr. later bought the home. His son-in-law A.W. Petmecky built a limestone addition in 1895.

== Old Central Drugstore ==
30°16′38″N 98°52′16″W
Designated a Recorded Texas Historic Landmark in 1985, Marker number 10014.

124 E. Main Street

Swiss immigrant and jeweler-watchmaker Alphons Walter erected the building in 1905. Sold in 1909 to Robert G. Striegler it was operated as the Central Drug Store by various proprietors for over 70 years. In 1954, the telephone exchange leased the second floor to house its switchboard and personnel. The building has also been home to a photography business and doctors offices.

== Pape Log Cabin ==
30°16′57″N 98°52′19″W

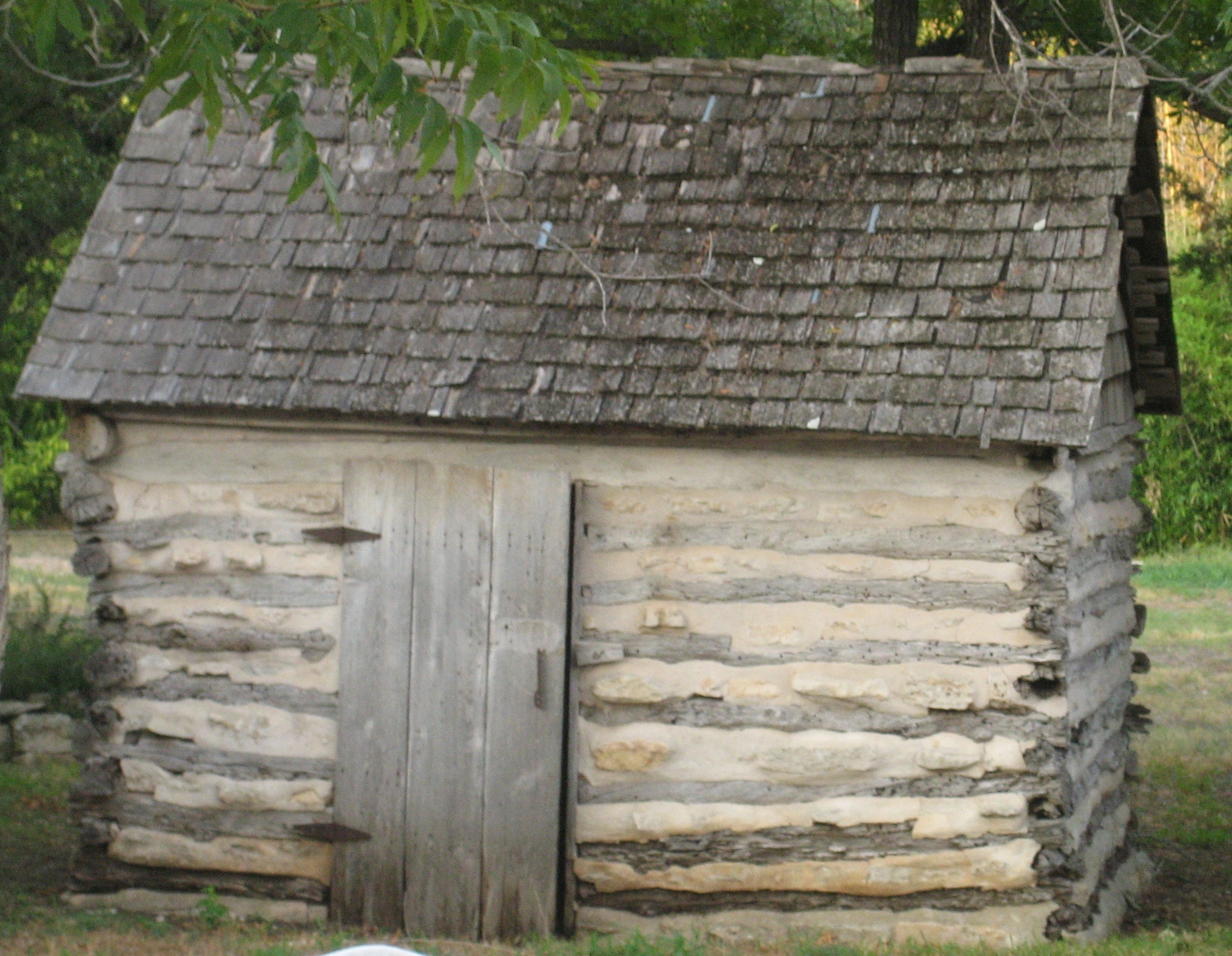
Pape Log Cabin

Designated a Recorded Texas Historic Landmark in 1974, Marker number 10092.

213 W. Creek

The Pape family was among the first colonists to arrive in Fredericksburg. The log cabin was built in 1846 from nearby post oak logs. It is believed the first roof was thatched grass

== Patton Home ==
30°16′14″N 98°52′28″W
Designated a Recorded Texas Historic Landmark in 1980, Marker number 10094.

107 N. Orange St.

Albert Lee Patton and his wife Emma Wahrmund Patton purchased property and built this native limestone house in 1876.

== Albert Lee Patton Building ==
30°16′58″N 98°52′16″W
Designated a Recorded Texas Historic Landmark in 1980, Marker number 10093.

222 W. Main

In 1897, Albert Lee Patton constructed a two-story native limestone building adjacent to his general store. The ground floor houses the Citizens Bank until it closed in 1932. The second floor was the Patton residence.

== Pioneer Memorial Library (1882 Gillespie County Courthouse) ==
30°16′31″N 98°52′25″W

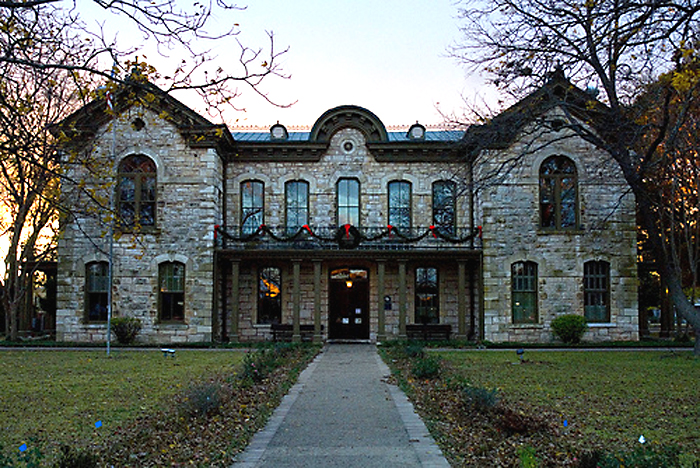
Pioneer Memorial Library Fredericksburg, Texas

The Pioneer Memorial Library was designated a Recorded Texas Historic Landmark in 1967, Marker number 10045.

115 W. Main Street

Designed by architect Alfred Giles, it served as the Gillespie County Courthouse from 1882 until 1939. The building was later renovated with underwriting from Mr. and Mrs. Eugene McDermott and was dedicated as a public library in 1967.

Added to the National Register of Historic Places in Texas on March 11, 1971, NRHP Reference #:71000935.

== William Rausch House ==
30°16′49″N 98°52′25″W
Designated a Recorded Texas Historic Landmark in 1985, Marker number 10099.

107 S. Lincoln

William Rausch and his wife Olga Rausch bought this property in 1894, but did not build a house on it until 1906. At that time, they erected a native limestone house, with a central gable and jig-cut decorative trim.

== Ressman-Boos House ==
30°16′32″N 98°51′38″W
Designated a Recorded Texas Historic Landmark in 1983, Marker number 10100.

511 E. Main Street

It is estimated that the earliest part of this fachwerk house was constructed in 1845. Later additions included log and clapboard construction. Christian and Katharina Ressmann purchased the home in 1866, and their family sold it in 1946 to Hilmar and Christian Boos.

== Riley-Enderlin House ==
30°16′07″N 98°52′43″W
Designated a Recorded Texas Historic Landmark in 1987, Marker number 10102.

606 N. Adams

This home was built in 1909 by Franz Stein for Emil H and Bertha Riley. The home was purchased in 1912 by Civil War veteran Charles Enderlin Sr.

== Little Rock House ==
30°16′59″N 98°52′27″W
Designated a Recorded Texas Historic Landmark in 1965, Marker number 10103.

215B W. Main

Built shortly after the Civil War. School teacher Heinrich Ochs bought this house in 1868.

== Schandua Building ==
30°16′31″N 98°52′08″W
Designated a Recorded Texas Historic Landmark in 1979, Marker number 10109.

205 E. Main

This hand-hewn limestone building was erected in 1897 and served as a residence for John and Bertha Klein Schandua. The family lived on the second story, and the hardware store was on the bottom story. The Masonic Lodge used to meet on the second floor. The hardware store operated until 1972.

== Pioneer Schandua House ==
30°16′34″N 98°52′15″W
Designated a Recorded Texas Historic Landmark in 1979, Marker number 10110.

111 E. Austin

Believed to have built before 1880, John Schandua purchased the house when he married Bertha Klein in 1883. The front room served at a bedroom and living area, while the back room was the children's bedroom. It was briefly used by the Bethany Lutheran Church.

== Schmidt-Dietz Building ==
30°16′20″N 98°52′05″W
Designated a Recorded Texas Historic Landmark in 1981, Marker number 10111.

218 W. Main Street

In the 1860s Ludwig Schmidt this two-story stone building as a hotel. It was leased to Louis Dietz in the 1890s, who ran both the Central Hotel and Dietz Hotel out of the building. Charles Schwarz bought the building in 1899 to open a store. The building has also housed a saloon, doctors' and lawyers' offices, and a drugstore.

== Schmidt-Gold House ==
30°16′39″N 98°52′22″W
Designated a Recorded Texas Historic Landmark in 1981, Marker number 10112.

106 S. Lincoln

Lorenz Schmitz built this 2 1/2-story house in the 1860s. The house was enlarged to two floors in 1902 by Jacob Gold Sr.

== Schneider-Klingelhoefer House ==
30°16′06″N 98°52′02″W
Designated a Recorded Texas Historic Landmark in 1988, Marker number 101114.

714 Main Street

A typical German fachwerk design house, with a porch roof parapet, gable-end chimneys, and a decorative wood balustrade. This was built c. 1870 for German watchmaker-stonemason Ludwig Schneider. Louis Priess owned the house 1883–1890. Arthur Klingelhoefer bought the house in 1924 and a year later resided in it until his death in 1947.

== Schwarz Building ==
30°16′04″N 98°52′56″W
Designated a Recorded Texas Historic Landmark in 1981, Marker number 10115.

216 W. Main

Charles Schwarz and his wife Mary constructed this native limestone commercial building in 1907. Schwarz General Merchandise and Dry Goods store was on the ground floor, and family living quarters were on the second floor. The building has since housed a variety of businesses and civic organizations.

== John Peter Tatsch House ==
30°16′03″N 98°52′44″W
Designated a Recorded Texas Historic Landmark in 1965, Marker number 10121.

210 N. Bowie Street

Corner of N. Bowie and W. Schubert Street. Built by John Peter Tatsch in 1856 using local stone. Tatsch, his wife Maria Elizabeth and their daughters emigrated from Irmenach in Rhineland-Palatinate, Germany in 1852. Tatsch became a master cabinetmaker in Fredericksburg, and his work is highly prized by collectors of Texas primitive furniture. He built the house himself, and the house was recorded by the Historic American Buildings Survey of the United States Department of Interior. The home's detailed plans were placed in the Library of Congress in 1936.

== White Elephant Saloon ==
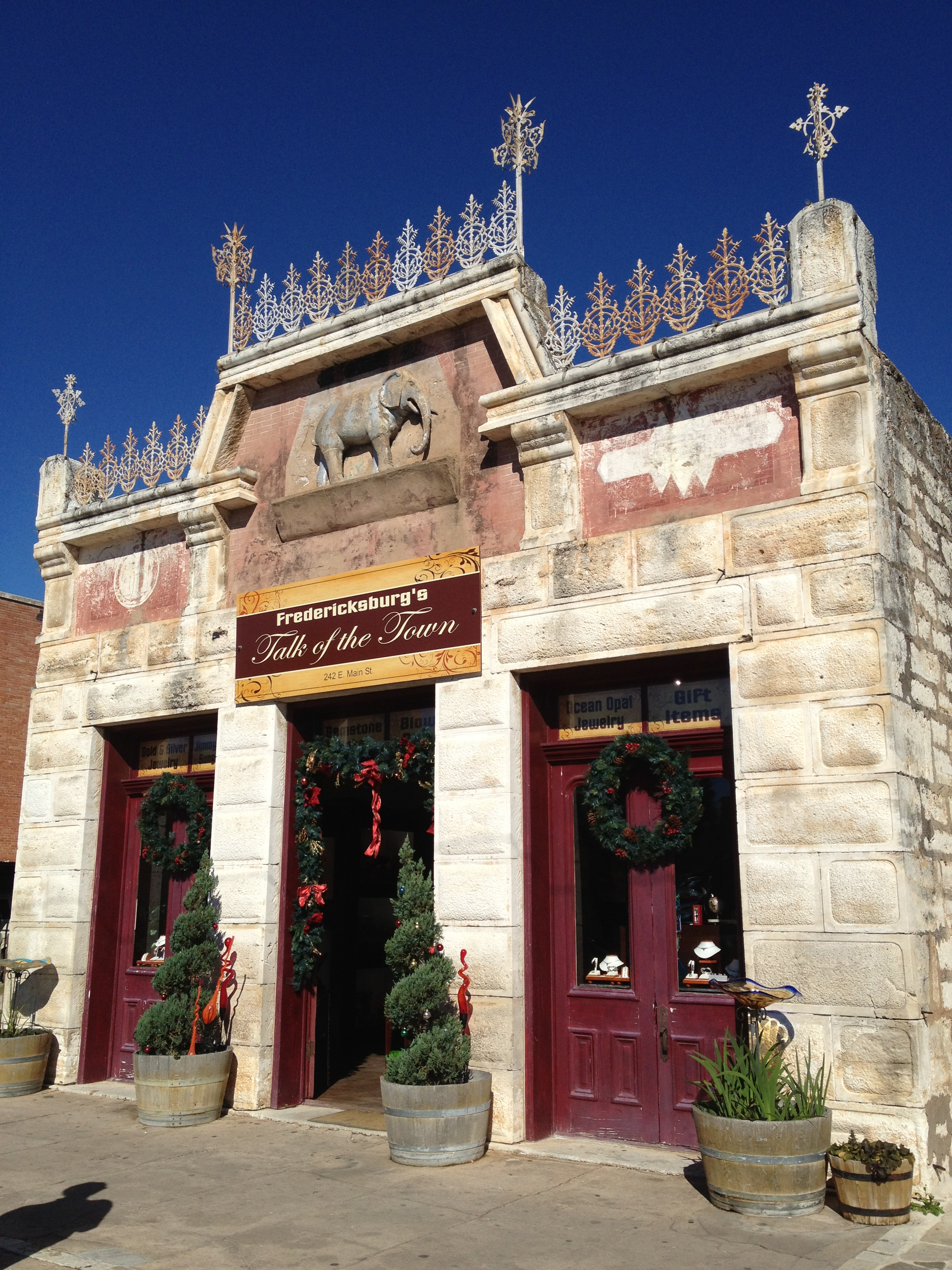
White Elephant Saloon

30°16′16″N 98°52′05″W

246 E. Main

Famous for its elephant relief parapet and rich iron cresting, the native limestone building was constructed in 1888 by John W. Kleck. Originally part of a chain of gentleman's resorts, the building was operated as a saloon until Prohibition.

== Churches ==
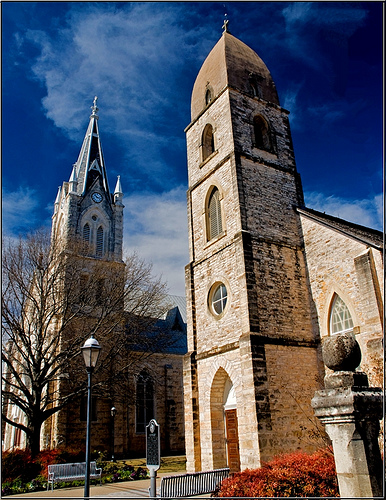
St. Mary's Catholic Church

Fredericksburg was founded on a tradition of religious tolerance. In 1847, Lyman Wight, with the blessing of John O. Meusebach, built a Mormon temple and founded the Zodiac community near Fredericksburg.

The Vereins Kirche was the first church in Fredericksburg, encompassing all religions under one roof. The majority of the initial settlers of Fredericksburg were of the Evangelical Protestant Church, but some were also Lutheran, Roman Catholic and Methodist. Catholics and Methodists broke away about 1848.

=== Bethany Lutheran Church ===
30°16′28″N 98°52′03″W
Designated a Recorded Texas Historic Landmark in 1990, Marker number 10011.

110 W. Austin Street

On March 27, 1887, eighty families adopted a constitution for Die Evangelische Kirche (The Evangelical church). The congregation met in the Vereins Kirche until they moved their services to Southern Methodist Church. In 1889, they decided to build their own church on a piece of land which cost $200. The building was completed September 9, 1889. Its name was changed in 1932 to Evangelische Lutherische Bethanien Gemeinde. In 1938, the congregation erected a new church on a 3-acre site a block away. In 1954, the congregation adopted the English name Bethany Evangelical Lutheran Church.

=== Christian Methodist Episcopal Church ===
30°16′16″N 98°51′02″W
Designated a Recorded Texas Historic Landmark in 1977, Marker number 10019.

520 E. Main Street

Christian Methodist Episcopal Church began in the 1870s as the Colored Methodist Episcopal Church in an 1877 school house which doubled as a worship house for black families who resided in the area. In 1887 Oscar Basse deeded the lot to trustees William McLane, Silas Russel, James Scruggins, and James Tinker. The building was restored in February 1976, and dedicated as the Christian Methodist Episcopal Church.

=== First Methodist Church ===
30°16′43″N 98°52′37″W
Designated a Recorded Texas Historic Landmark in 1972, Marker number 10038.

312 W. San Antonio Street

First Methodist Church of Fredericksburg was founded 1849 by the Rev. Eduard Schneider, with charter members: Melchior and Rosine Bauer, Johann and Margaretha Durst, Friedrich and Sophie Ellebracht, Ernst and Dorothea Houy, Ferdinand and Maria Kneese, Ludwig Kneese, Heinrich and Catharine Steihl, Jacob and Catharine Treibs, Fritz and Fredericka (Mary) Winkel. In 1855, during pastorate of the Rev. C. A. Grote, a 40 x 60-foot (18 m) native stone church was built.

=== Holy Ghost Lutheran Church ===
30°16′29″N 98°52′01″W
Designated a Recorded Texas Historic Landmark in 1981, Marker number 10056.

113 San Antonio Street

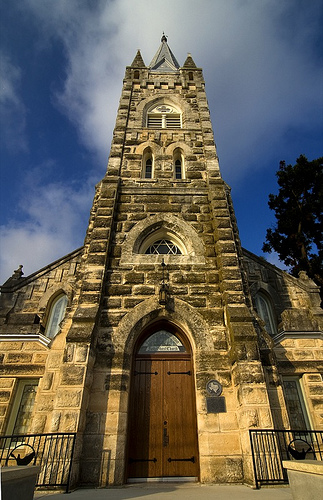
Front view of Holy Ghost Lutheran Church

Evangelical Protestant Church of the Holy Ghost (Heilige Geist), later to be known as Holy Ghost Lutheran Church, split from the Vereins Kirche congregation in 1886. The cornerstone for the new church was laid in 1888, and the building was finished in 1893.

=== St. Barnabas Episcopal Church ===
30°17′17″N 98°52′09″W
Designated a Recorded Texas Historic Landmark in 1962, Marker number 10105.

W. Creek Street and S. Bowie Street

Architect: Overland Partners|Architects

St. Barnabas Episcopal Church began in 1946 as meetings in individual homes. President and Mrs. Lyndon B. Johnson attended the 1964 groundbreaking for the church building. Lady Bird Johnson presented the church with a stone from St. Barnabas Church in Cyprus that she had received from Archbishop Makarios on a 1962 visit to the island nation. Mrs. Johnson was a member of St. Barnabas in Fredericksburg, which became the Texas home church for the Johnsons. The President took communion there.

=== St. Mary's Catholic Church and Our Lady of Guadalupe Chapel ===
30°16′37″N 98°36′01″W
St. Mary's Catholic Church was added to the National Register of Historic Places in Texas in Texas on June 21, 1983, NRHP Reference #:83003143.

306 W. San Antonio

The Catholics began their congregation in 1846. After breaking away from the Vereins Kirche, they erected a log cabin church in 1848. Construction began on Marienkirche (old St. Mary's Church) in 1860. The cornerstone was laid June 1861. The native limestone building was complete November 1863, and a Native American was asked to ring its bell at the dedication. Our Lady of Guadalupe Chapel was built in 1919 to serve Spanish speaking residents of the area. Cornerstone for the new St. Mary's Catholic Church was laid July 4, 1905, built of native limestone in Gothic architecture. The church was completed in 1908.

=== Zion Lutheran Church ===
30°16′10″N 98°52′06″W
The Zion Lutheran Church was designated a Recorded Texas Historic Landmark in 1964, Marker number 10132

424 W. Main

Six Lutheran families broke away in 1852 and founded Zion's Evangelical Lutheran Church. On January 13, 1853, twelve founders signed its articles of organization. The cornerstones for the church were set on March 6, 1854, making it the oldest Lutheran Church in the Texas Hill Country.

== Friends of Gillespie County Country Schools ==
Headquartered in Fredericksburg, the Friends of Gillespie County Country Schools is a group of former students and members of the community, interested in preserving the old country schools, along with the community clubs, and the history of Gillespie County for future generations.

== Gallery ==
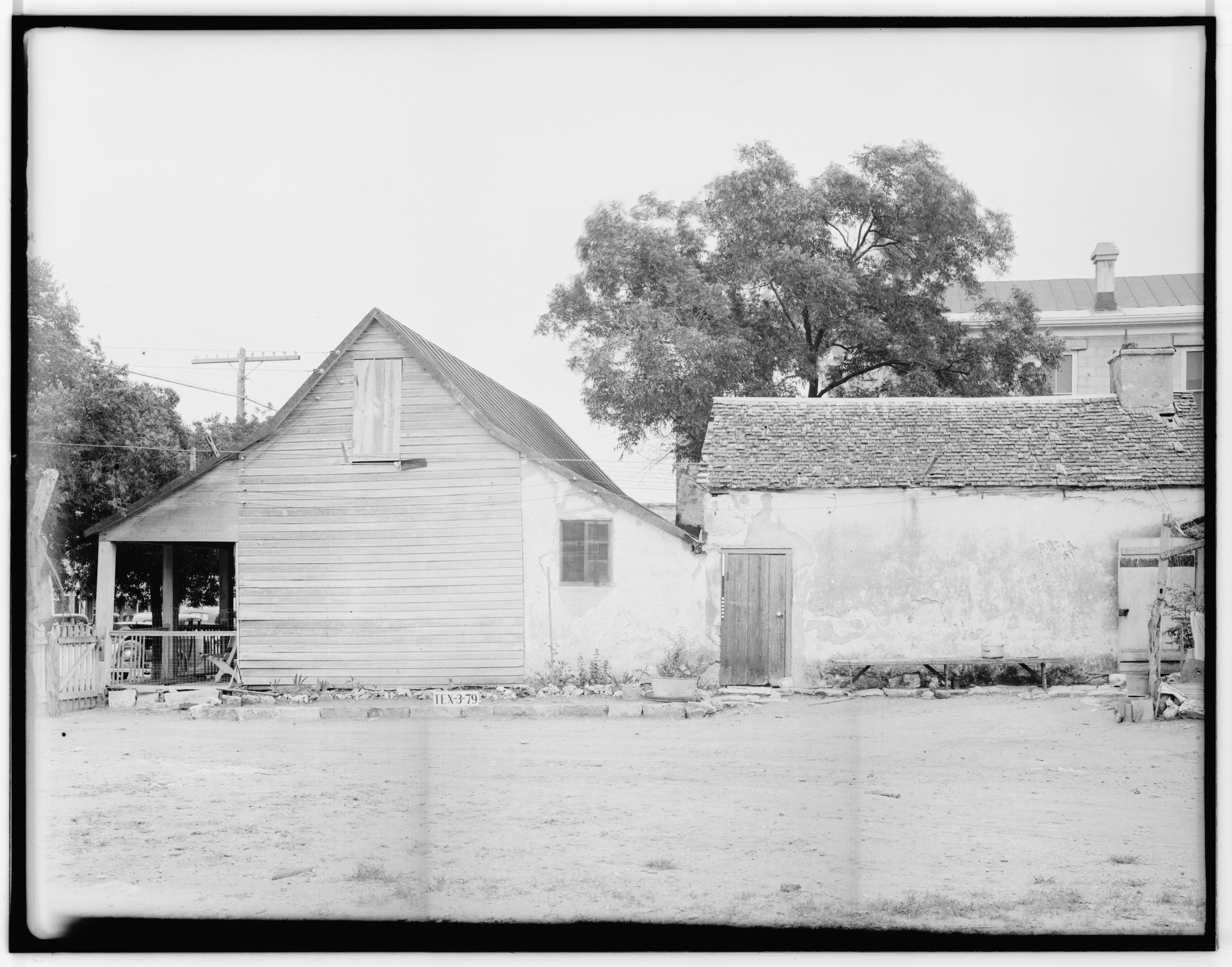
Heinrich Kammlah House 309 West Main

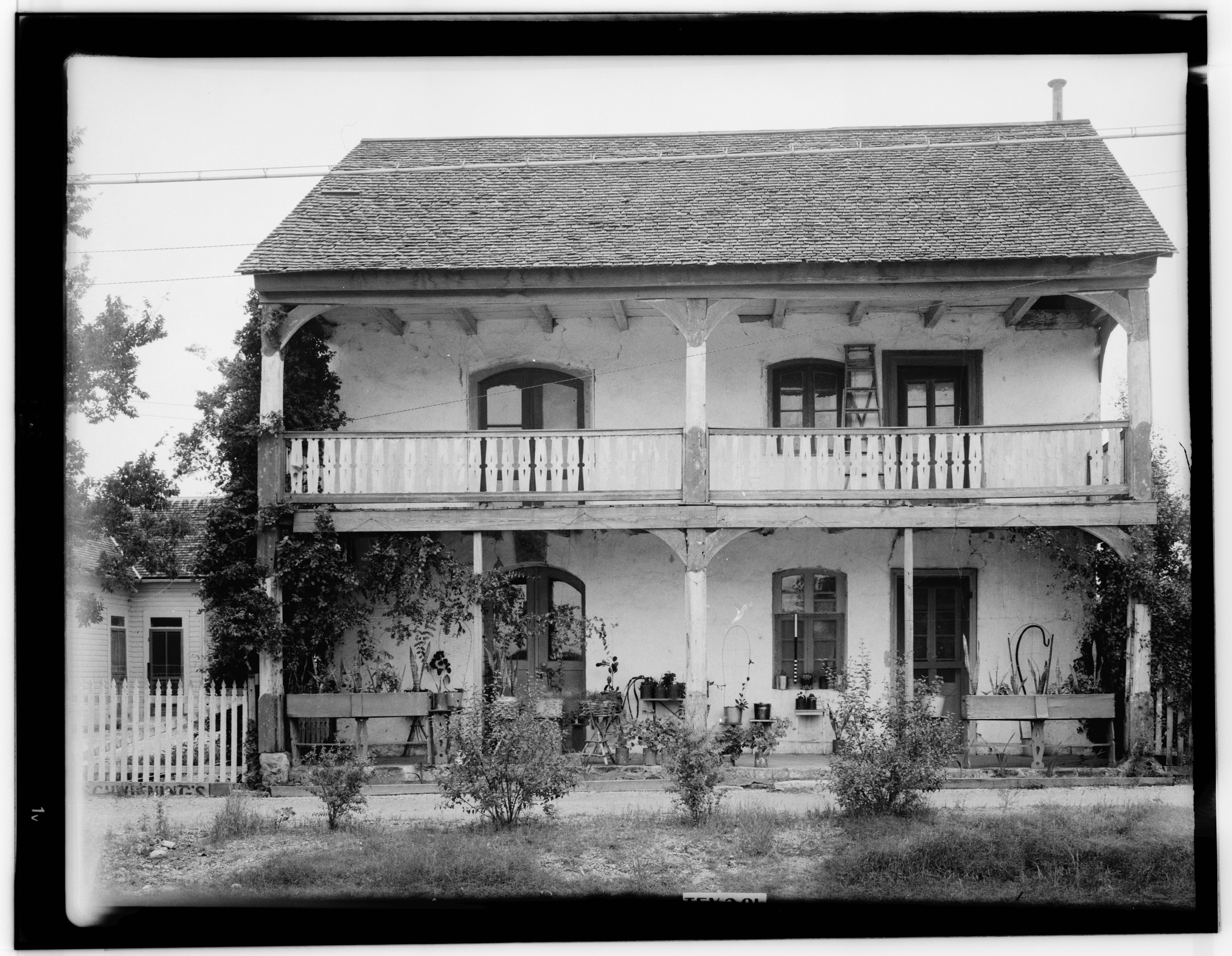
Kiehne-Foerster (Hermann) 405 E. Main

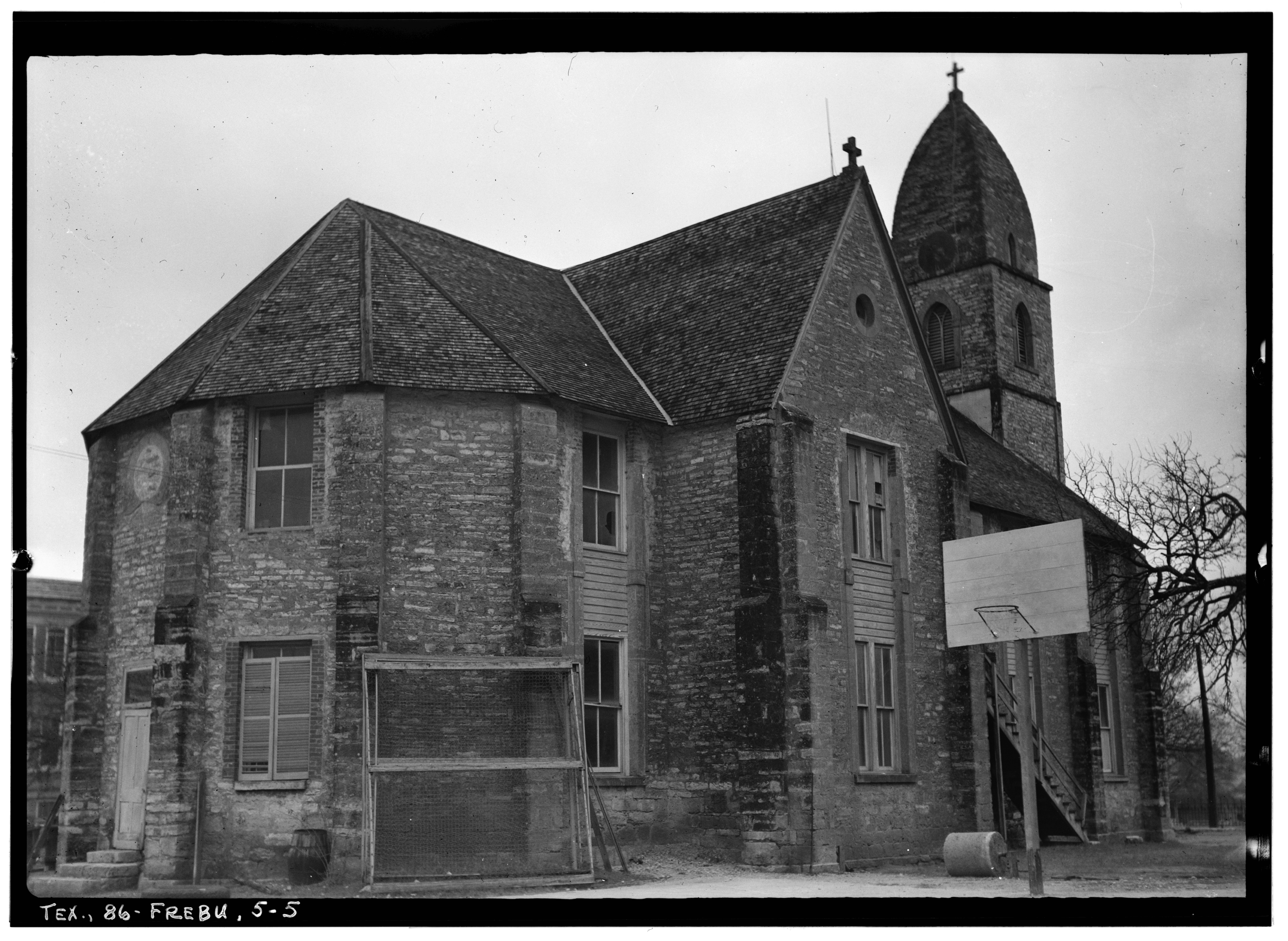
Old St. Mary's Catholic Church San Antonio Street

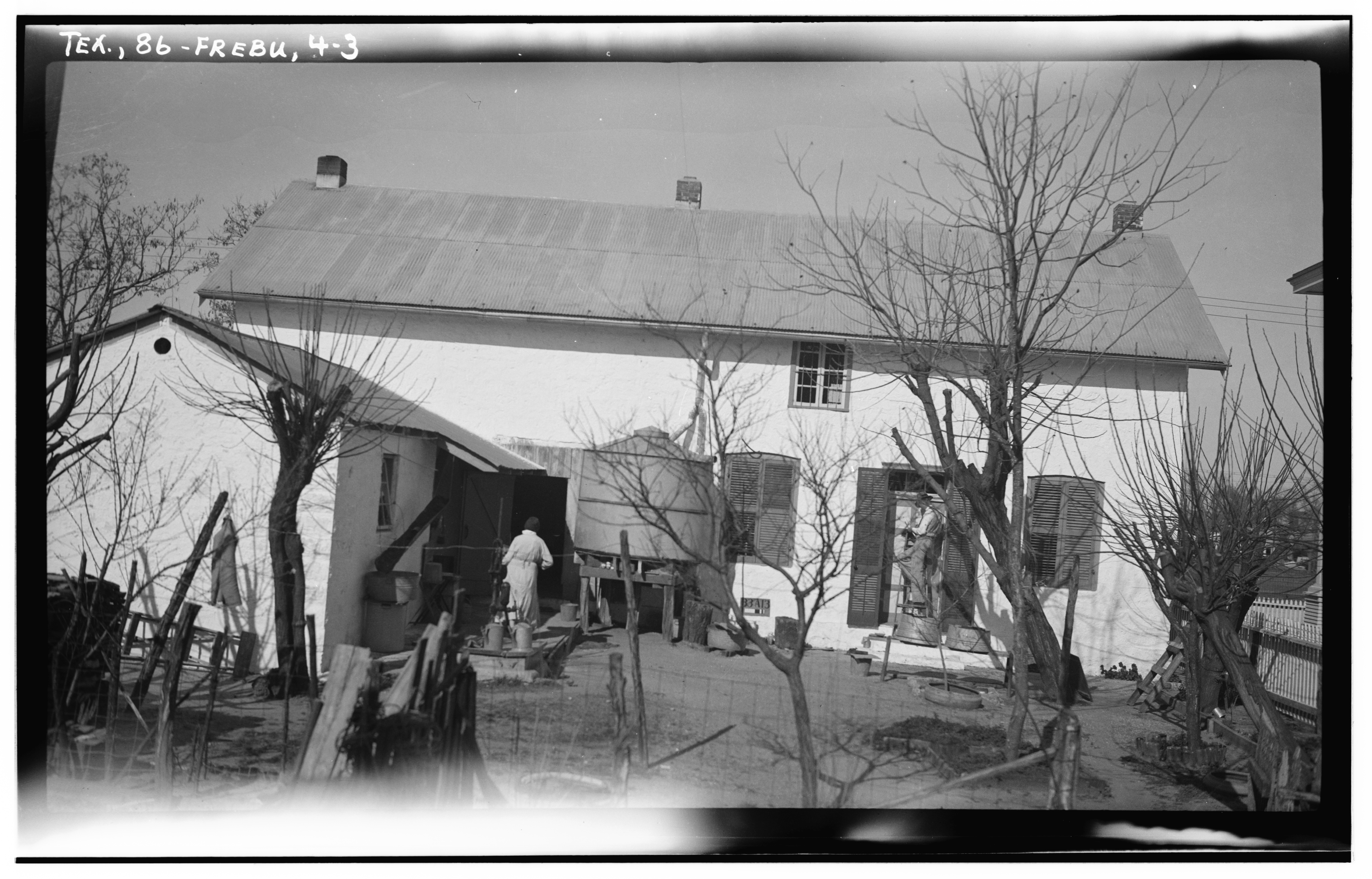
Pfeil House 125 W. San Antonio Street

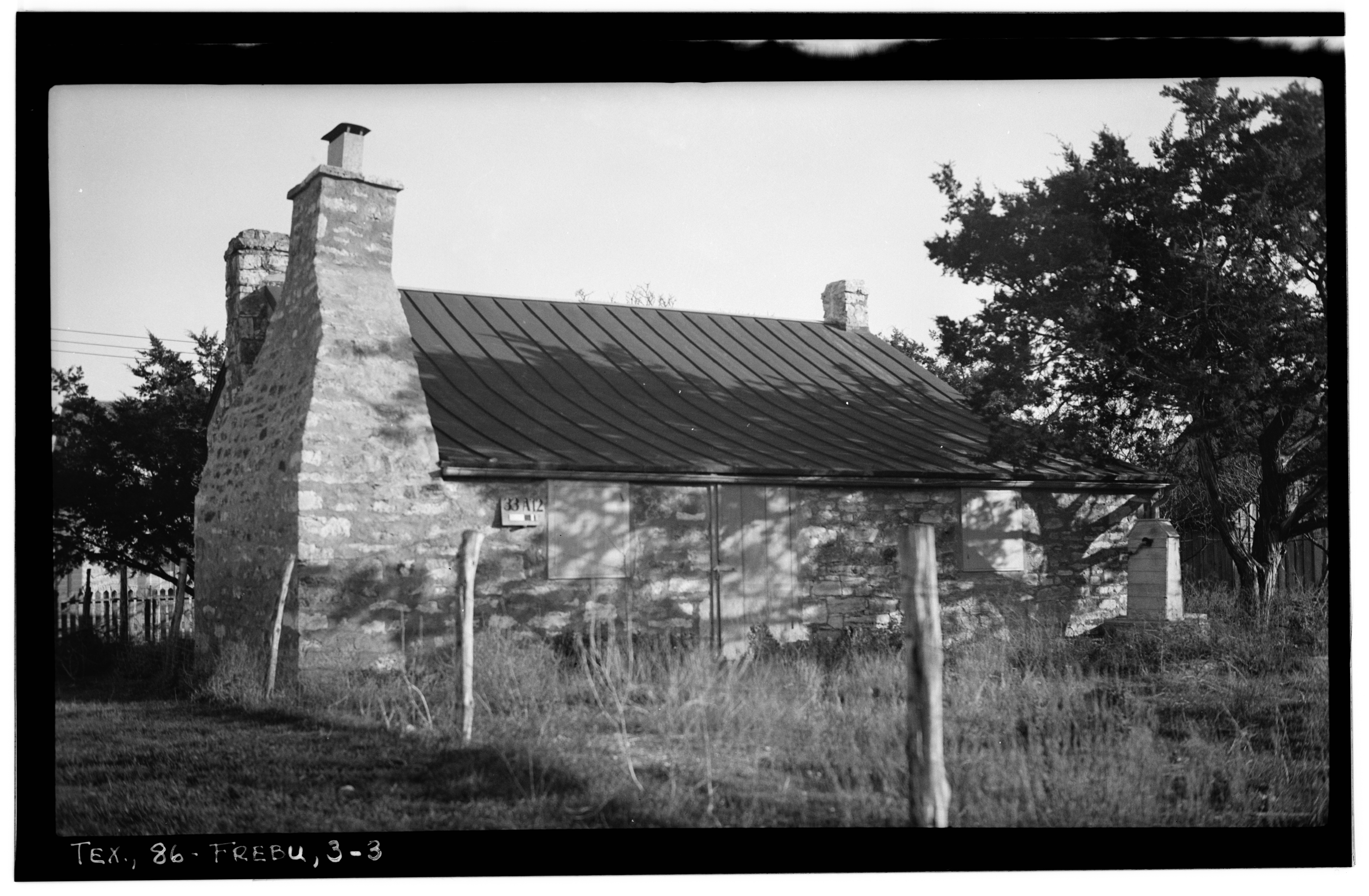
John Pete Tatsch House 210 N. Bowie Street

== See also ==
- Fort Martin Scott
- History of Fredericksburg, Texas
- List of museums in Central Texas
