= Friedrich Armand Strubberg =

Texas pioneer and author (1806–1889)

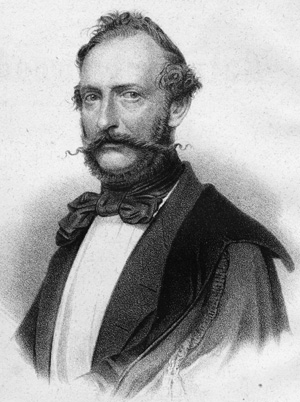
- Born: March 18, 1806; Kassel, Hesse, Germany
- Died: April 3, 1889 (aged 83); Linsengericht (Altenhasslau), Germany
- Other name: Dr. Friedrich Schubbert
- Occupations: Merchant; Physiclan; Author
- Known for: Pioneer settler and author

Friedrich Armand Strubberg (born Frédéric Armand Strubberg, March 18, 1806 in Kassel, Germany – April 3, 1889 in Linsengericht, Germany) was a merchant, medical doctor, and pioneer colonist. Born in Germany, Strubberg spent many decades in the United States. In Texas, he used the pseudonym Dr. Friedrich Schubbert. He designed the Vereins Kirche in Fredericksburg. Strubberg spent the last few decades of his life as an author in Germany.

== Family background and early life ==
The man known in Texas as Dr. Friedrich Schubbert claimed to be of royal descent and was born Frédéric Armand Strubberg on March 18, 1806, in Kassel, Hesse, Germany. His father was tobacco merchant Henry Frédéric Strubberg, son of Frédéric Rodolphe Strubberg and Emilie Cordesse. Henry Strubberg was a grandson of Anna Amalie and her husband Christian Friedrich Strubberg. Frédéric's assertion to be a great-great-grandson of Frederick I of Sweden based on an alleged morganatic marriage between Frederick I and the widow of a General Count Wilmsdorf-Brevendorf in the years 1717–1720 (which never occurred) and that Anna Amalie was an offspring of this marriage. An aristocratic family of the name Wilmsdorf-Brevendorf never existed. His mother was Frederique Elise of the aristocratic Marville family. Strubberg grew up in a house of wealth and privilege, groomed for a career in the mercantile business.

== The United States ==
Strubberg made his first voyage to the United States as a representative of the mercantile houses, stopping at Niagara Falls in 1828, and returning home to Hesse in 1829. For the next decade, Strubberg remained in Germany as an integral partner in his father's tobacco business. His return visit to the North American continent was also connected to the mercantile business and included North Carolina, South Carolina, Virginia, New York, Maryland, New Orleans, and Havana.

While en route to Texas in the early 1840s, Strubberg visited Louisville, Kentucky and enrolled in a local medical school at the urging of one of the school's instructors. It was here he earned a medical degree in two years. Upon receiving his diploma, Strubberg visited Memphis, Tennessee and purchased a stallion, which he rode to Texas. Strubberg passed through Dallas and traveled down to the Rio Grande. From there, he journeyed to the Leona River into what became Uvalde County. He looked upon this area as a place to build his new life, and returned to Memphis to enlist others to help him with the new settlement. He went north east by way of San Antonio, Austin, Nacogdoches and Natchez, Mississippi, then up the Mississippi River to Memphis. When he returned to the banks of the Leona, he was accompanied by three other men, re-entering Texas from Shreveport, Louisiana and across Caddo Lake. By this point in time, he was operating under the alias of Dr. Schubbert.

Strubberg had teamed up with Henry Francis Fisher by February 1845, and, according to Prince Carl of Solms-Braunfels, began trying to lure emigrating Adelsverein settlers to a colony that Strubberg and Fisher were starting in Milam County. When John O. Meusebach succeeded Prince Solms as Commissioner-General of the Adelsverein, he followed advice from Henry Fisher and in June 1846 appointed Strubberg to lead colonists into what became known as Fredericksburg. Strubberg designed the Vereins Kirche community building in the center of Fredericksburg. Without authorization from Meusebach, Strubberg led an armed group of colonists into Comanche territory. Shawnee scouts reported seeing 40,000 to 60,000 Kickapoo at the Llano River, and Strubberg's group retreated to Fredericksburg. When Meusebach was not deterred and decided to make his own journey into Comanche territory, Strubberg instigated a failed coup d'état against Meusebach. Ninety-five colonists signed a petition urging Meusebach to remain as Commissioner-General.

On July 12, 1847, Meusebach sent Strubberg a letter of dismissal from his position as director of Fredericksburg. Jean Jacques von Coll was appointed his successor. Strubberg retreated to Nassau Plantation, and refused to relinquish the position to von Coll. After Hermann Spiess succeeded Meusebach as Commissioner-General of the Adelsverein, he engaged Strubberg in a gunfight on October 28, 1847, while trying to oust him from the plantation.

Strubberg became active in the Mexican–American War until its end in 1848. He then joined medical teams in Arkansas to combat several epidemics in the area. He built a home, became a slave owner, and opened a medical practice in Camden, Arkansas.

== Return to Europe ==
A freak accident in 1854, with an insect sting to his eye, brought his return to Europe for medical treatments. By 1860, he was again living in Kassel with his sister Emilie. There he changed careers and became an author, both of fiction and non-fiction.

== Personal life and death ==
Three times Strubberg was engaged to be married. While in New York sometime in the 1830s or 1840s, his engagement to an heiress led to a duel over her affections and the death of his opponent. Strubberg fled New York with the intent of seeking a new life in Texas. During his years in Arkansas, he became engaged to the owner of a slave plantation. It is unclear if this last engagement also led to marriage. Strubberg became a slave owner, but whether that was through marriage to his fiancée in Arkansas, or in his own right, is unknown.

The first engagement was in 1826 to Antoinette Sattler in Germany. She was the daughter of a fellow merchant. A non-fatal duel with a romantic rival for her affections coincided with Strubberg's departure for his first journey to the United States. Antoinette did not make the trip with him, and he apparently never saw her again until the latter part of his life. He re-connected with Antoinette in the last decade of his life, after his return to Germany. Unknown to Strubberg, she had spent the intervening years in an asylum and had only recently been released. The two were married. Antoinette became afflicted with a form of dementia and had to be institutionalized and died in the asylum.

His sister Emilie with whom he had been living died in late January or early February 1876 (buried Febr. 2). In August 1885, Strubberg moved to Altenhasslau where he spent the rest of his life. He died April 3, 1889, and was buried in a local graveyard there. The graveyard was removed in 1957, the memorial slab was brought to Erfurt and got lost.

== Works by Strubberg ==
- Amerikanische Jagd- und Reiseabenteuer aus meinem Leben in den westlichen Indianergebieten (1858)
- Bis in die Wildniß (1858)
- Scenen aus den Kämpfen der Mexicaner und Nordamerikaner (1859)
  Die Amerikaner in Mexico
  Der Sturm von San Antonio
- Alte und neue Heimath (1859)
- An der Indianergrenze (1859)
- Ralph Norwood (1860)
- Sclaverei in Amerika (1862)
- Carl Scharnhorst. Abenteuer eines deutschen Knaben in Amerika (1862, preliminary matter: 1863)
- Der Sprung vom Niagarafalle (1864)
- In Mexico (1865)
- Saat und Ernte (1866)
- Friedrichsburg, die Colonie des deutschen Fürsten-Vereins in Texas (1867)
- Aus Armand's Frontierleben (1868)
- In Süd-Carolina und auf dem Schlachtfelde von Langensalza (1868)
- Die Quadrone (Play) (1869, revised 1885)
- Der Mann ohne Poesie (Play) (1869, under the pseudonym Norwald) (1943 destroyed in WWII)
- Der Krösus von Philadelphia (1870)
- Die Fürstentochter (1872)
- Die alte spanische Urkunde (1872)
- Der Methodisten-Geistliche (1873)
- Zwei Lebenswege (1873)
- Die geraubten Kinder. Eine Erzählung aus Texas für die Jugend (1875)
- Vornehm und Bürgerlich. Roman aus dem Leben von Armand (1878)
- Gustav Adolf (Play) (1882)
- Der Freigeist (Play) (1883)
- Leben und Tod des Kaisers Friedrich Barbarossa (Play) (1886)

=== Critical Edition ("Marburger Ausgabe") ===
- Vol. I: Amerikanische Jagd- und Reiseabenteuer (2010, 2nd Ed. 2011) ISBN 978-3-8288-2701-1
- Vol. III: Scenen aus den Kämpfen der Mexicaner und Nordamerikaner / Alte und neue Heimath (2011) ISBN 978-3-8288-2703-5
- Vol. V: Ralph Norwood (Spring 2012)
- Vol. VII: Carl Scharnhorst (Winter 2011/2012)
- Vol. XVIII: Die geraubten Kinder (2011) ISBN 978-3-8288-2718-9
- Vol. XIX: Vornehm und Bürgerlich (2010, 2nd Ed. 2011) ISBN 978-3-8288-2719-6
