= History of Fredericksburg, Texas =

American municipal history

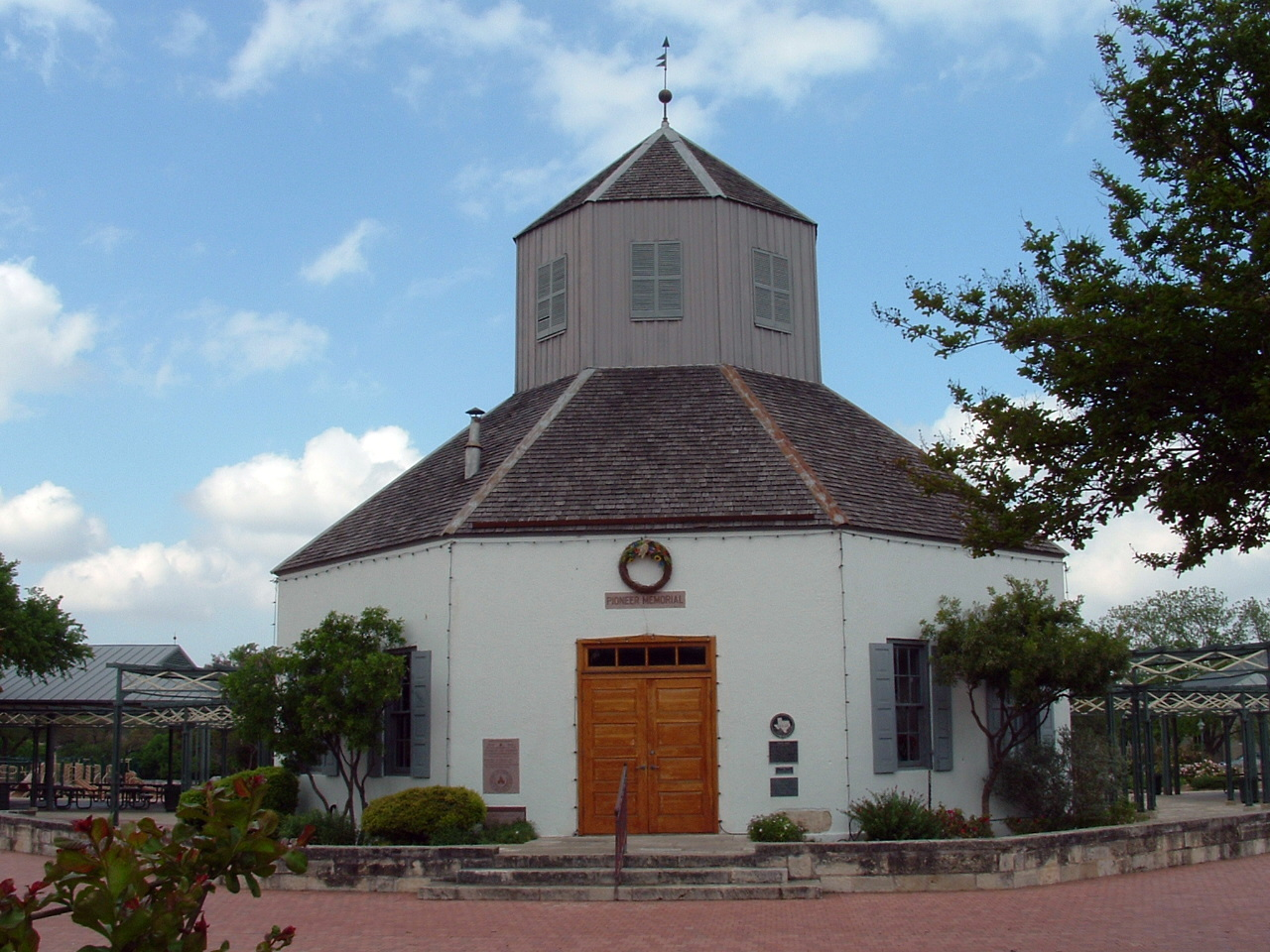
The Vereins Kirche was the first public structure erected in Fredericksburg

The History of Fredericksburg, Texas dates back to its founding in 1846. It was named after Prince Frederick of Prussia. Fredericksburg is also notable as the home of Texas German, a dialect spoken by the first generations of German settlers who initially refused to learn English. Fredericksburg shares many cultural characteristics with New Braunfels, which had been established by Prince Carl of Solms-Braunfels the previous year.

== 19th century ==
Fredericksburg (German: Friedrichsburg) was founded in 1846 by Baron Otfried Hans von Meusebach, new Commissioner General of the "Society for the Protection of German Immigrants in Texas", also known as the "Noblemen's Society" (in German: Mainzer Adelsverein). The emigration was in part the liberal, educated Germans fleeing the social, political, and economic conditions that later resulted in the Revolution of 1848, and in part working-class Germans. Baron von Meusebach renounced his noble title and became known in Texas as John O. Meusebach. The area's Barons Creek was named in Meusebach's honor.

=== Meusebach-Comanche Treaty ===
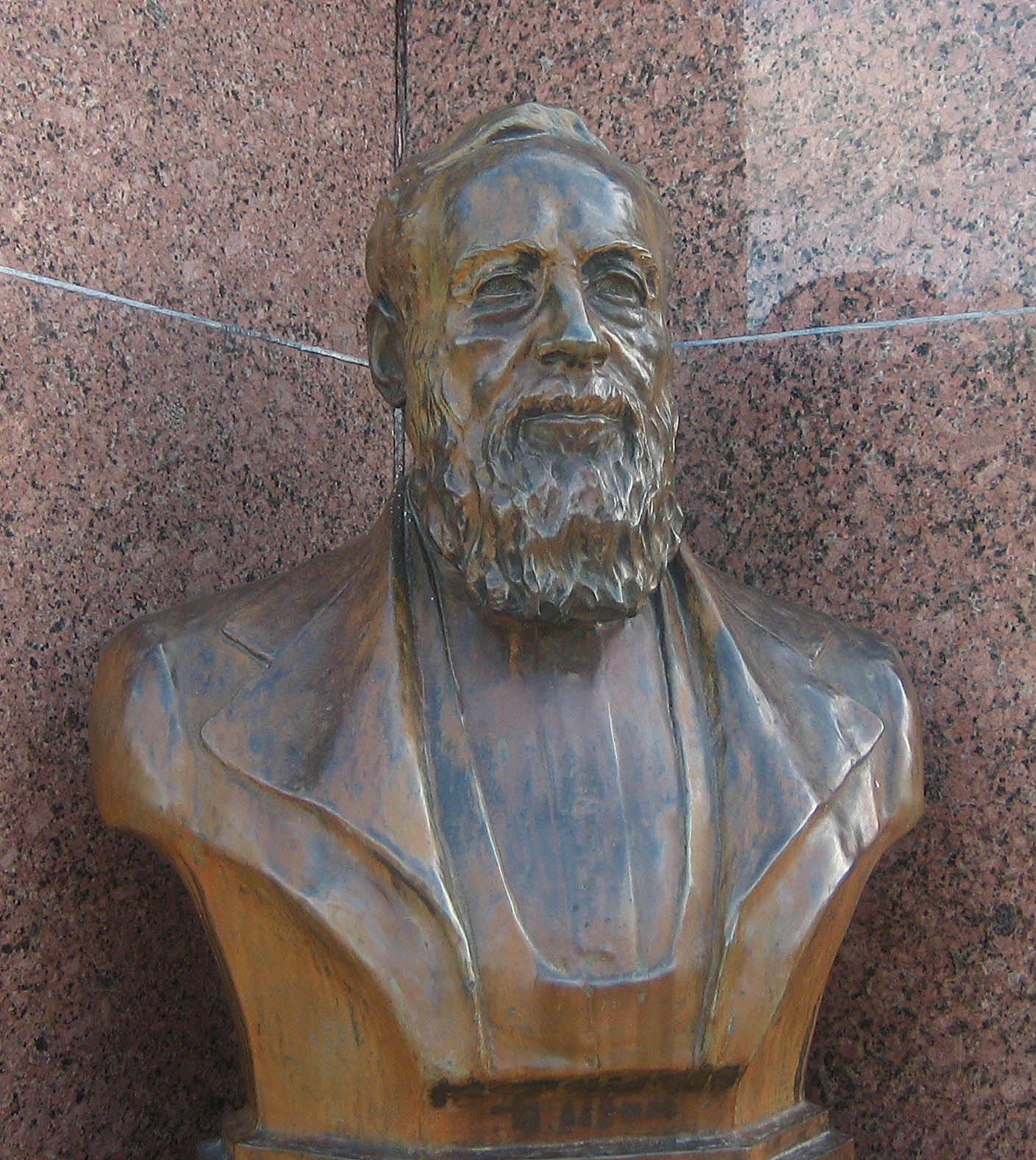
Bust of Baron von Meusebach in Fredericksburg Town Square

The reddish-blonde haired John O. Meusebach was named El Sol Colorado (The Red Sun) by Penateka Comanche Chief Ketemoczy (Katemcy), who had encountered Meusebach and his group in the area of present-day Mason. Meusebach, accompanied by geologist Ferdinand von Roemer, Special Agent Robert Neighbors, F. Shubbert, Jean Jacques von Coll, trader John F. Torrey and interpreter Anton Felix Hans Hellmuth von Blücher (aka Felix A. von Blücher), brokered the 1847 Treaty between the Comanche and the German Immigration Company. The treaty was unique in that it did not take away the rights of the Penateka Comanche, but was an agreement that the Comanche and settlers would mutually share the land, co-existing in peace and friendship. Meusebach paid the Penateka Comanches $3,000, slightly less than $70,000 in today's money, in food, gifts, and other commodities for their participation in the signing of the agreement. The native American signers of the treaty were only from the Penateka band. It is one of the very few treaties with native American tribes that was never broken.

==== Easter Fires ====
The Easter Fires pageant in Fredericksburg draws from two beginnings. In Germany and the Catholic Church, variations have occurred on the custom of lighting hilltop evening bonfires in close proximity of Easter to celebrate the coming of spring.

The Fredericksburg variation is a living-history event which celebrates the signing of the 1847 Meusebach-Comanche Treaty. While the treaty was signed after Easter, the final negotiations were completed on March 1 and 2, with Easter of 1847 occurring on April 3. The Fredericksburg Easter Fires legend has it that Penateka Comanches signaled each other about the progress of the treaty negotiations by lighting huge fires on the hills. Settler mothers calmed their children by giving a twist on the traditional German story of Easter fires, and telling children the fires on the hills were lit by bunnies who were boiling water to make eggs for Easter morning. In some versions of the story, the Comanches lit the fires to celebrate the signing of the treaty, and the bunnies were boiling Texas wildflowers to make the colors for the eggs.

The pageant is held traditionally the Saturday before Easter, and recreates the signing of the treaty with bunny-dressed participants of all ages lighting the fires on surrounding hillsides. The show has been a big tourist draw since 1946. The pageant was suspended in recent years due to cost and logistics, but a group of citizens is trying to revive it.

=== Town founding ===
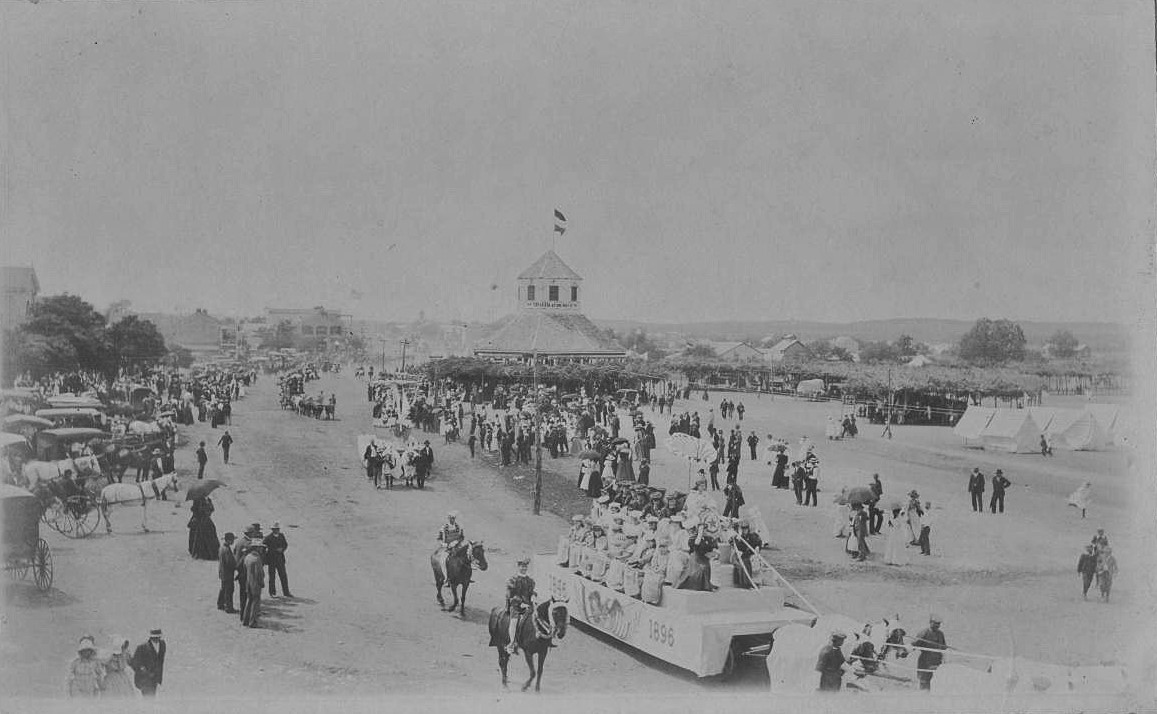
Fredericksburg, Texas 1896 parade celebrating 50th anniversary of the town's founding. Vereins Kirche in the background.

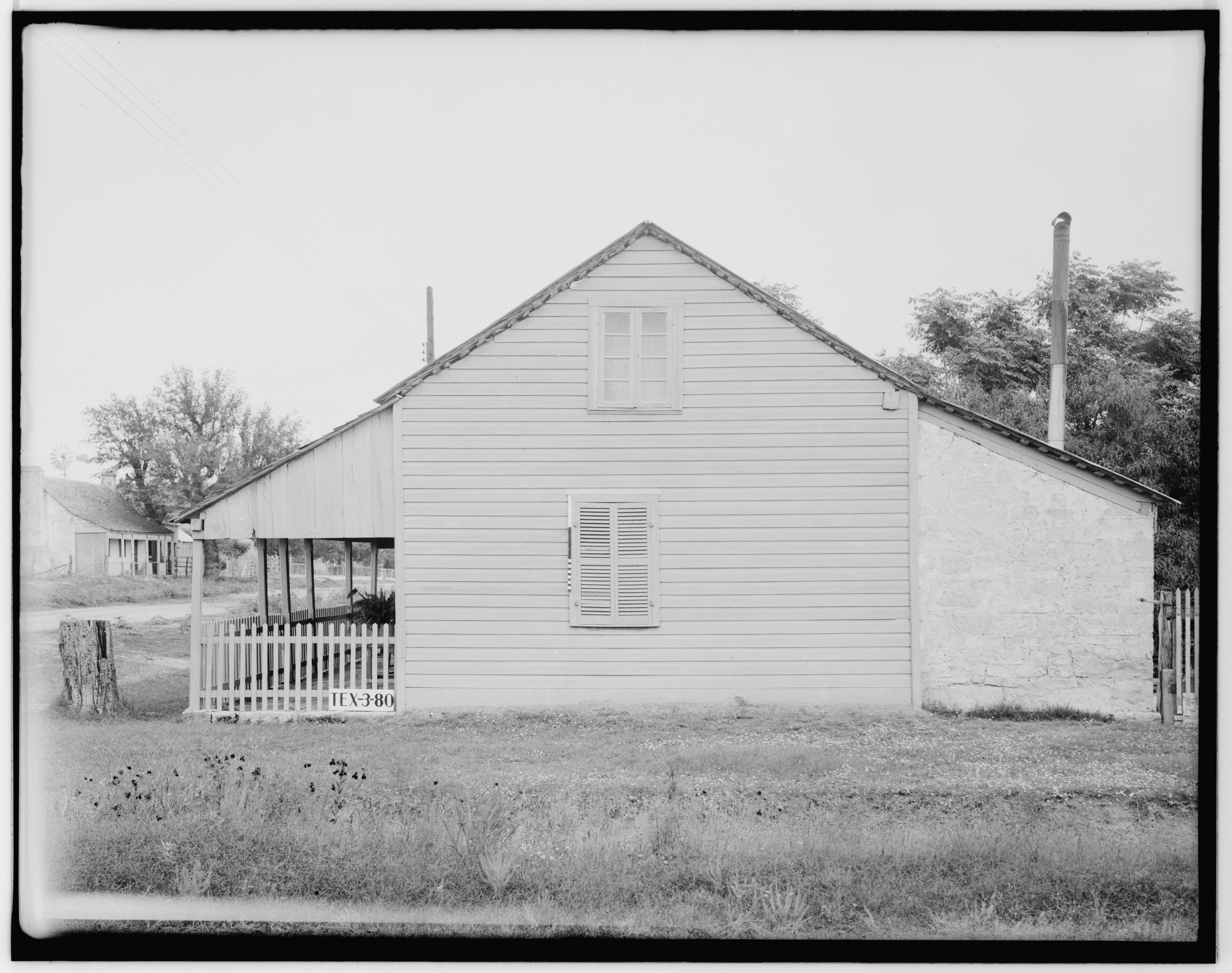
House of Heinrich G. Dietz

In 1845, Meusebach set out from New Braunfels, traveling 60 miles (97 km) northwest to select the second settlement of the Fisher-Miller Land Grant. He opted for a valley situated between two creeks, which are now known as Barons Creek and Town Creek, and surrounded by seven hills. He named it in honor of Prince Frederick of Prussia, the highest-ranking member of the Mainzer Adelsverein and nephew of King Frederick William III of Prussia. For the settlement, he purchased 10,000 acres (40 km^{2}) on credit, for an allotment per settler of one town lot, plus 10 acres (40,000 m^{2}) of farmland.

In December 1845, on orders from Meusebach, Lieutenant Louis (Ludwig) Bene, along with lead surveyor Johann Jacob Groos and crew, constructed a road from New Braunfels to the site of Fredericksburg. The town was laid out by surveyor Herman Wilke. On April 23, 1846, the first wagon train of settlers left New Braunfels, encountering friendly Delaware Indians en route, and arrived at the Fredericksburg site on May 8, 1846. The first colonists immediately set about to plant a garden and build a storehouse out of logs, and a stockade and a blockhouse.

The settlers soon received via courier a belated message from Governor James Pinckney Henderson advising them that uncertain movements by the government of Mexico made it unclear whether Texas could offer protection to the settlers. Governor Henderson advised against moving into the area at that time. The settlers refused to return to New Braunfels.

Meusebach designated Dr. Friedrich A. Schubbert, also known as Friedrich Armand Strubberg, as director of the new colony, to lead a second expedition into Fredericksburg in June 1846. Schubbert designed the Vereins Kirche, the first public building in Fredericksburg. Without authorization from Meusebach, in 1846, Schubbert led an armed group of colonists into Comanche territory. Shawnee scouts reported seeing 40,000 to 60,000 Kickapoo at the Llano River, and Schubbert's group retreated to Fredericksburg. Meusebach decided to enter Comanche territory himself, resulting in the treaty with the Penateka.

Ferdinand von Roemer arrived in Fredericksburg in January 1847, and described what he estimated to be a settlement of 600 people:

The main street, however, did not consist of a continuous row of houses, but of about 50 houses and huts, spaced long distances apart on both sides of the street. Most of the houses were log houses for which the straight trunks of the oak trees growing round about furnished excellent building material. Most of the settlers, however, were not in possession of such homes, since they required so much labor, but they lived in huts, consisting of poles rammed into the ground. The crevices between the poles were filled with clay and moss, while the roof was covered with dry grass. Some even lived in linen tents which proved very inadequate during these winter months.

Roemer described a diet of bear meat, corn, and coffee. He reported that dysentery was a common ailment. He also noted the disease of "stomachache" that engulfed the lungs and throat, was treated with citric acid, but still caused daily fatalities.

Schubbert instigated a failed coup d'état against Meusebach. Ninety-five colonists signed a petition urging Meusebach to remain as Commissioner-General. On July 12, 1847, Meusebach sent Schubbert a letter of dismissal from his position as director of Fredericksburg. Jean Jacques von Coll was appointed his successor. Coll was a retired first lieutenant of the Duchy of Nassau, who had been appointed by Prince Solms as the first financial officer of New Braunfels. Coll was later elected mayor of New Braunfels in 1852.

On December 15, 1847, a petition was submitted to create Gillespie County. In 1848, the legislature formed Gillespie County from Bexar and Travis Counties. While the signers were overwhelmingly German immigrants, names also on the petition were Castillo, Pena, Munos, and a handful of non-German Hispanic names.

The first sheriff of the county was Louis (Ludwig) Martin, who emigrated from Erndtebrück North Rhine-Westphalia, Germany with the first Adelsverein group aboard the Johann Detthard in 1844, and moved with the original settlers to Fredericksburg. He was one of the 1847 signers of the petition to create Gillespie County. He became district clerk in 1850.

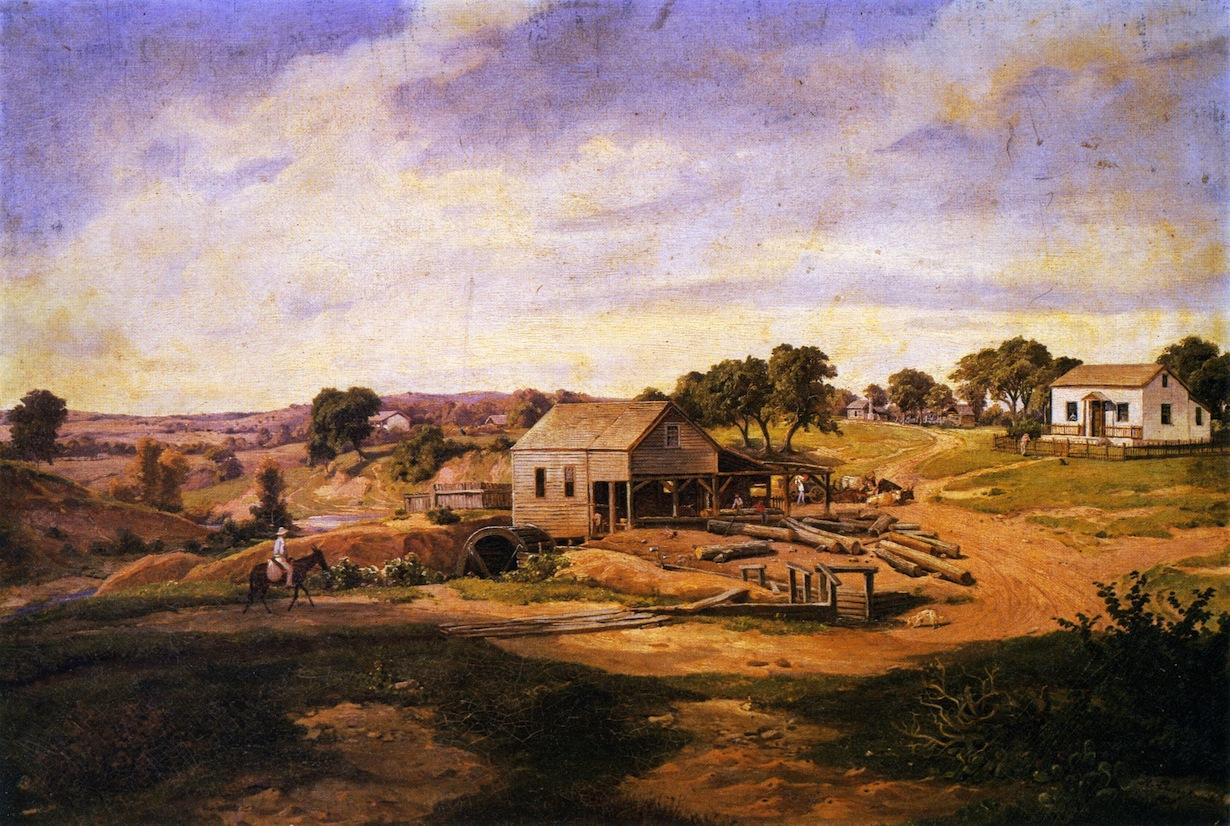
Guenther's Mill on Live Oak Creek painted in 1855 by Hermann Lungkwitz

Wilhelm Victor Keidel, who emigrated from Hildesheim, Lower Saxony, Germany, became the area's first doctor and the first elected chief justice in 1848.

Theodore Specht became the first postmaster of Fredericksburg on December 7, 1848. Specht was from Braunschweig, Germany, and emigrated to Fredericksburg with his wife Maria Berger in 1846. The Spechts operated a store out of their home that was frequented by Penateka Comanches. Local Penateka chief Santa Anna brought one of his wives to the store during a cold winter for her to give birth to a son.

Pioneer Flour Mills was founded on Live Oak Creek in Fredericksburg in 1851 by Carl Hilmar Guenther, an immigrant from Weissenfels, Germany. He served as justice of the peace in 1856. In 1859, after two years of drought, the Guenther family moved the mills to San Antonio.

=== Fort Martin Scott ===
On July 1, 1850, an angry mob of 50 Fort Martin Scott soldiers burned down the store-courthouse in Fredericksburg, in a clash with store owner and County Clerk John M. Hunter over refusal to sell whiskey to a soldier. Soldiers also prevented townspeople from saving the county records.

=== Civil War and Reconstruction ===
Fredericksburg was primarily part of the pro-Union Texas resistance during the Civil War, but a portion of the population remained loyal to the Confederacy. While many Germans saw slavery as an evil, the 1860 census showed 33 slaves in Gillespie County. Matthew Gaines was a runaway slave from a Robertson County plantation and had been captured in 1863 by the Texas Rangers at Menard. He was taken to Fredericksburg, where he was forced to work for the duration of the war. Upon gaining his freedom, he moved to Burton, where he was eventually elected as a member of the Texas Senate. In 1877, the Colored Methodist Episcopal Church served both as a house of worship and as a school for black families in the area.

The citizenry dealt with the spread of lawlessness during and after the war years. School teacher Louis Scheutze was kidnapped from his home and hanged, an act suspected to have been carried out by James P. Waldrip in response to Scheutze's vocal opposition to Confederate rule. Waldrip was alleged to have been part of the notorious Die Haengebande (Hanging Band) that handed out vigilante justice in the Hill Country. He was also a convicted thief and generally feared and disliked by people of the area. In 1867, Waldrip was shot by an unknown person outside the Nimitz Hotel. He was buried in secret, so as to prevent desecration of his grave.

== 20th and 21st centuries ==
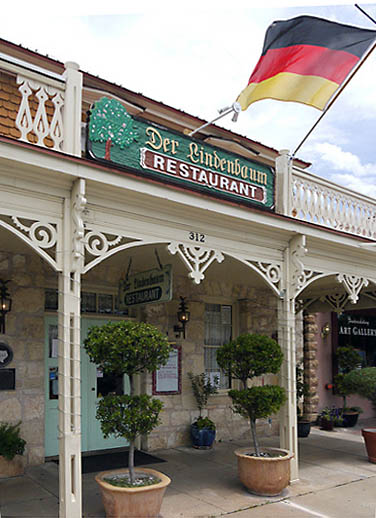
Der Lindenbaum reflects the German heritage of Fredericksburg.

Estimated Fredericksburg population for 1904 was 1,632. Frank Stein built the town's first ice factory in 1907. From 1913 to 1942, the Fredericksburg and Northern Railway connected Fredericksburg to Waring. Fredericksburg was incorporated as a city in 1928.

During the first half of the 20th century, Fredericksburg remained much like other Texas Hill County farm and ranch communities of German heritage, isolated from the commercialization of their culture. The most notable influxes of outsiders were sporadic visitors during events such as the Easter Fires, the county fair, and hunting season, but the population and its growth remained anchored to its roots.

Things began to change when Lyndon B. Johnson became Vice President of the United States. Possibly the most momentous event in modern Fredericksburg happened on Sunday, April 16, 1961, when Johnson, Fleet Admiral Chester Nimitz, and the first Chancellor of West Germany Konrad Adenauer helicoptered in to the Fredericksburg fairgrounds racetrack for a reception. They were joined onstage by U.S. Congressman O. C. Fisher and John O. Meusebach's only surviving offspring, 95-year-old Mrs. Ernest Marschall of Llano. Crowd estimates were between 7,000 and 10,000. The 1960 population of Fredericksburg was only 4,629. Accompanying the dignitaries was an entourage of family members, German state officials, multiple security forces, and the national media. Speeches were in English (Nimitz, LBJ), and in German (everyone else) with no translation needed. The Austin Recording Company was on hand to tape the saengerfest segment of the program. The fest featured the Marychorale Choir of St. Mary's Catholic Church and Felix Pehl directing the Arlon Männerchor. Chancellor Adenauer sang along with the Kinderchor portion of the fest, which was directed by Erna Dietel Heinan. The Fredericksburg High School Band entertained and appeared the following day at an Austin parade honoring the Chancellor. The Fredericksburg event was capped by a 10-car caravan tour of Fredericksburg, while Nimitz instead visited his relatives.

On November 22, 1963, when Lyndon Johnson became President of the United States, global attention focused upon the Texas White House at nearby Stonewall. The Nimitz Hotel served as headquarters for the media who intertwined their favorable impressions of the area with their reporting on the President. The Johnsons attended church in Fredericksburg. Dignitaries were escorted around Fredericksburg by the President. West Germany Chancellor Ludwig Erhard visited Fredericksburg in 1963 and was greeted with "Herzlich Wilkommen" and heard a sermon in German at Bethany Lutheran Church. Throughout LBJ's vice presidency and presidency, Fredericksburg prospered from the tourism trade, and it changed from an isolated community into one catering to the tourist dollar.

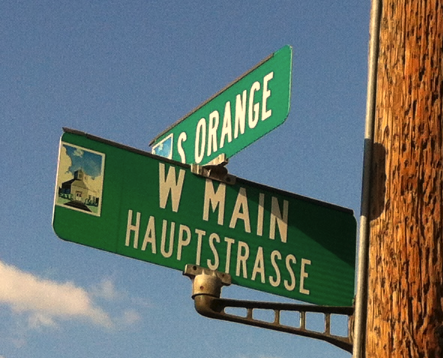
Fredericksburg capitalizes on its German heritage for tourists.

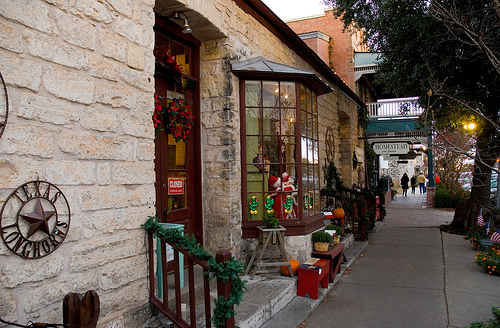
Main Street (Hauptstrasse)

Fredericksburg has profited from spill-over tourism of nearby Luckenbach ever since a few events propelled the little town with a population of three to global fame. Jerry Jeff Walker recorded his landmark 1973 Viva Terlingua album at the Luckenbach dance hall. In 1977, Waylon Jennings and Willie Nelson recorded their hit Luckenbach, Texas (Back to the Basics of Love). Additionally, the National Museum of the Pacific War has become a big draw to military history buffs. Fredericksburg has become attractive to retirees and people looking to relocate to a simpler way of life. Real estate became a prime business as prices rose. The city has become a weekend destination for people in Central Texas, specifically those from Austin and San Antonio.

Fredericksburg in the 21st century is in a state of flux. As each generation of descendants of the original settlers dies away, or moves to new horizons, the authenticity of the rural German farm culture of the Texas Hill Country communities also dies away. It is gradually blending with the customs of newcomers and being replaced by tourist-oriented concepts of both German heritage and the Texas cowboy culture. In 1934, the Gillespie County Historical Society was formed and now houses over 300,000 artifacts. Along with like-minded individuals and organizations, the historical society is dedicated to preserving artifacts, architecture, and the history of Fredericksburg.

== See also ==
- Der Stadt Friedhof
- Fredericksburg Historic District (Texas)
- List of museums in Central Texas
