= Dallas Historical Society =

American historical association

The Dallas Historical Society is an organization dedicated to the history of Dallas, Texas (USA). It was organized on March 31, 1922, by citizens who wished to encourage historical inquiry. In 1938, the Society assumed the management of the Hall of State at Fair Park at the request of the City of Dallas. The Historical Society operates with a full and part-time staff of ten and an annual operating budget of approximately US$1,000,000. The Historical Society owns the only known copy of General Order No.3, which enforced the liberation of all slaves in Texas.

== See also ==
- List of historical societies in Texas
