= List of historical societies in Texas =

The following is a list of historical societies in the state of Texas, United States.

== Organizations ==
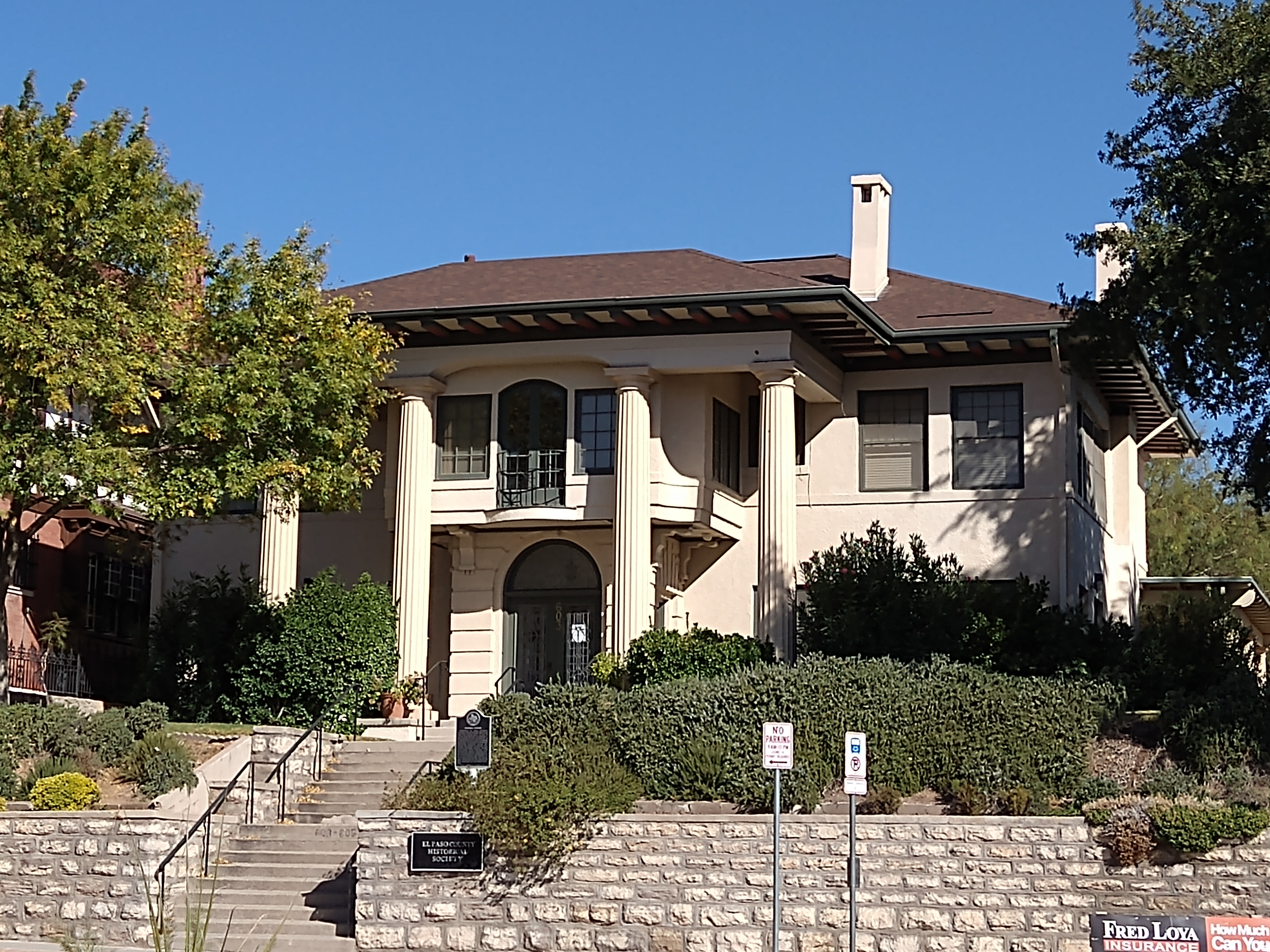
El Paso County Historical Society building in Texas (photo 2020)

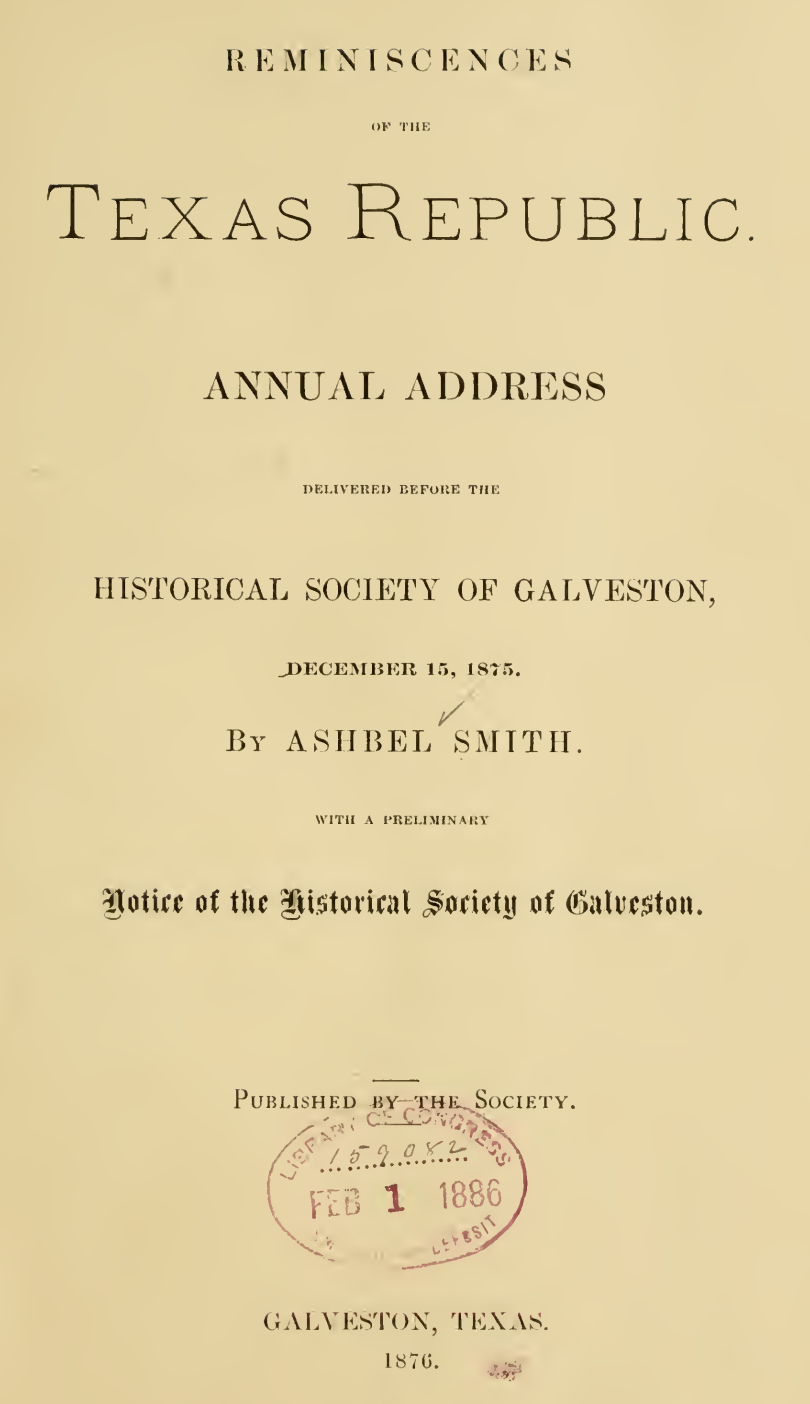
Title page of an 1876 publication of the Historical Society of Galveston, Texas

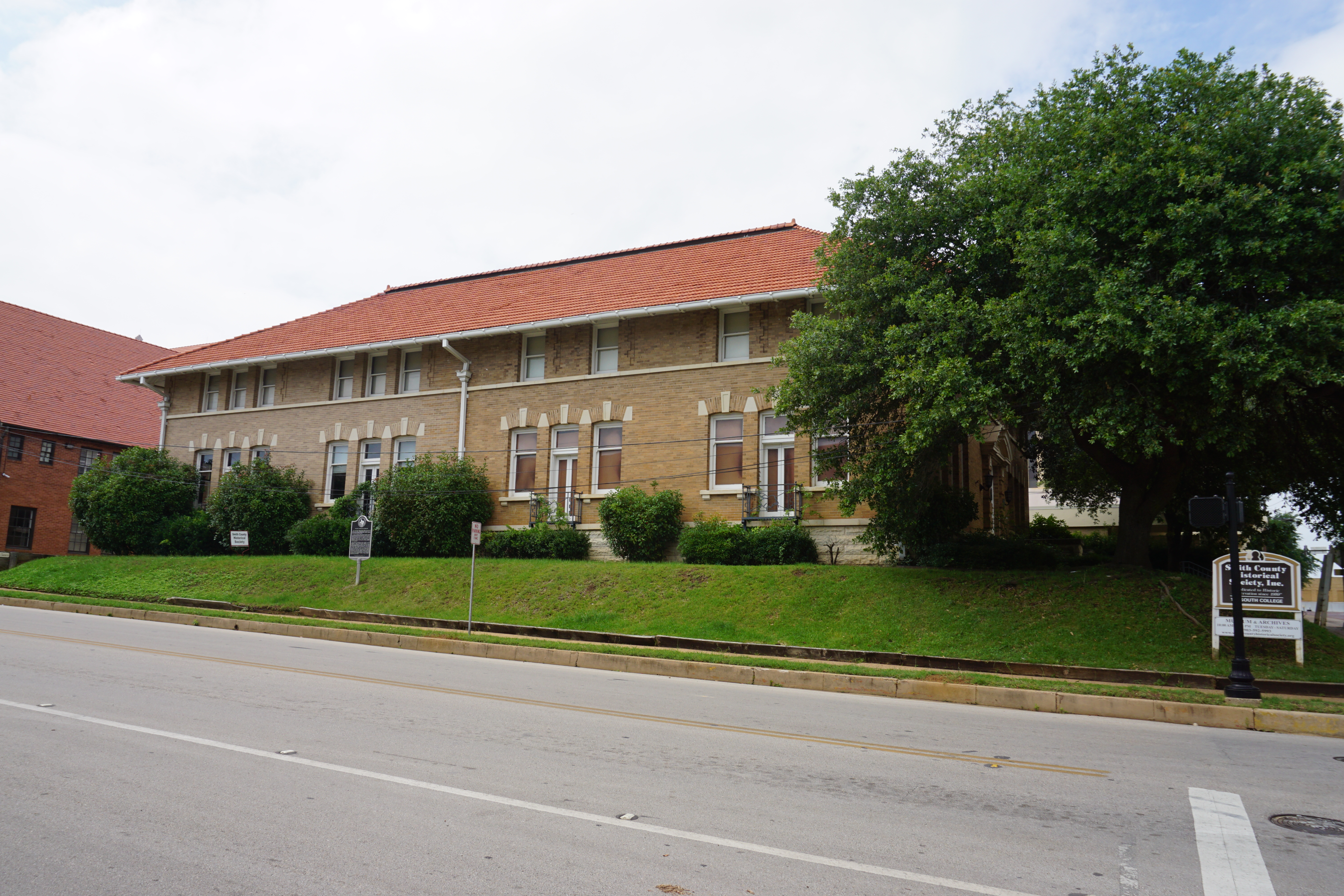
Smith County Historical Society building and sign in Tyler, Texas (photo 2016)

- Anna Area Historical Preservation Society
- Aransas County Historical Society
- Atascosa County Historical Society
- Bastrop County Historical Society
- Bee County Historical Society
- Bell County Historical Society
- Bellaire Historical Society
- Birdville Historical Society
- Brown County Historical Society
- Burleson County Historical Society
- Central Texas Historical Association
- Clay County Historical Society
- Cleveland Historical Society
- Cochran County Historical Society
- Collin County Historical Society
- Comanche County Historical Society
- Dallas Historical Society
- Deaf Smith County Historical Society
- East Montgomery County Historical Society
- East Texas Historical Association
- El Paso County Historical Society
- Friendswood Historical Society
- Galveston Historical Foundation (formerly Galveston Historical Society)
- Gillespie County Historical Society
- Harris County Historical Society
- Harrison County Historical Society
- Henderson County Historical Society
- Hidalgo County Historical Society
- Hill County Historical Association
- Hopkins County Historical Society
- Hudspeth County Historical Society
- Indianola Historical Society
- Irion County Historical Society
- Karnes County Historical Society
- Katy Historical Society
- Kemah Historical Society
- Kinney County Historical Society
- Lamar County Historical Society
- Leon County Historical Society
- Leon Valley Historical Society
- Llano County Historical Society
- Mason County Historical Society
- Menard County Historical Society
- Midland Historical Society
- Murphy Historical Society
- Nacogdoches Historical Society
- Navarro County Historical Society
- Nueces County Historical Society
- Orange County Historical Society
- Panhandle-Plains Historical Society
- Permian Historical Society
- Rains County Historical Society
- Reagan County Historical Society
- Red River County Historical Society
- Refugio County Historical Society
- Riesel Historical Society
- San Antonio Historical Association
- San Augustine County Historical Society
- Shelby County Historical Society
- Sherman County Historical Society
- Smith County Historical Society
- Somerset County Historical Society
- South Texas Historical Association
- Sterling County Historical Society
- Sutton County Historical Society
- Tarkington Prairie Historical Society
- Tarrant County Black Historical and Genealogical Society
- Tarrant County Historical Society
- Texas Catholic Historical Society
- Texas Gulf Historical Society
- Texas Jewish Historical Society
- Texas State Historical Association
- Tom Green County Historical Society
- Upton County Historical Society
- Walker County Historical Society
- Waller County Historical Society
- West Texas Historical and Scientific Society
- West Texas Historical Association
- Wilson County Historical Society
- Wise County Historical Society
- Wood County Historical Society
- Wylie Historical Society

== See also ==
- History of Texas
- List of museums in Texas
- National Register of Historic Places listings in Texas
- List of historical societies in the United States
