= West Texas Historical Association =

The West Texas Historical Association is an organization of both academics and laypersons dedicated to the preservation and dissemination of West Texas history, loosely covering the geography of all Texas counties west of Interstate 35, and adjacent regions that include eastern New Mexico, western Oklahoma and southeastern Colorado..

== History ==
The group was founded in Abilene in 1924. Among its founding members were R. C. Crane, William Curry Holden and Rupert N. Richardson.

== See also ==
- List of historical societies in Texas
