= Fredericksburg Historic District (Texas) =

Historic district in Texas, United States

- U.S. National Register of Historic Places
- U.S. Historic district
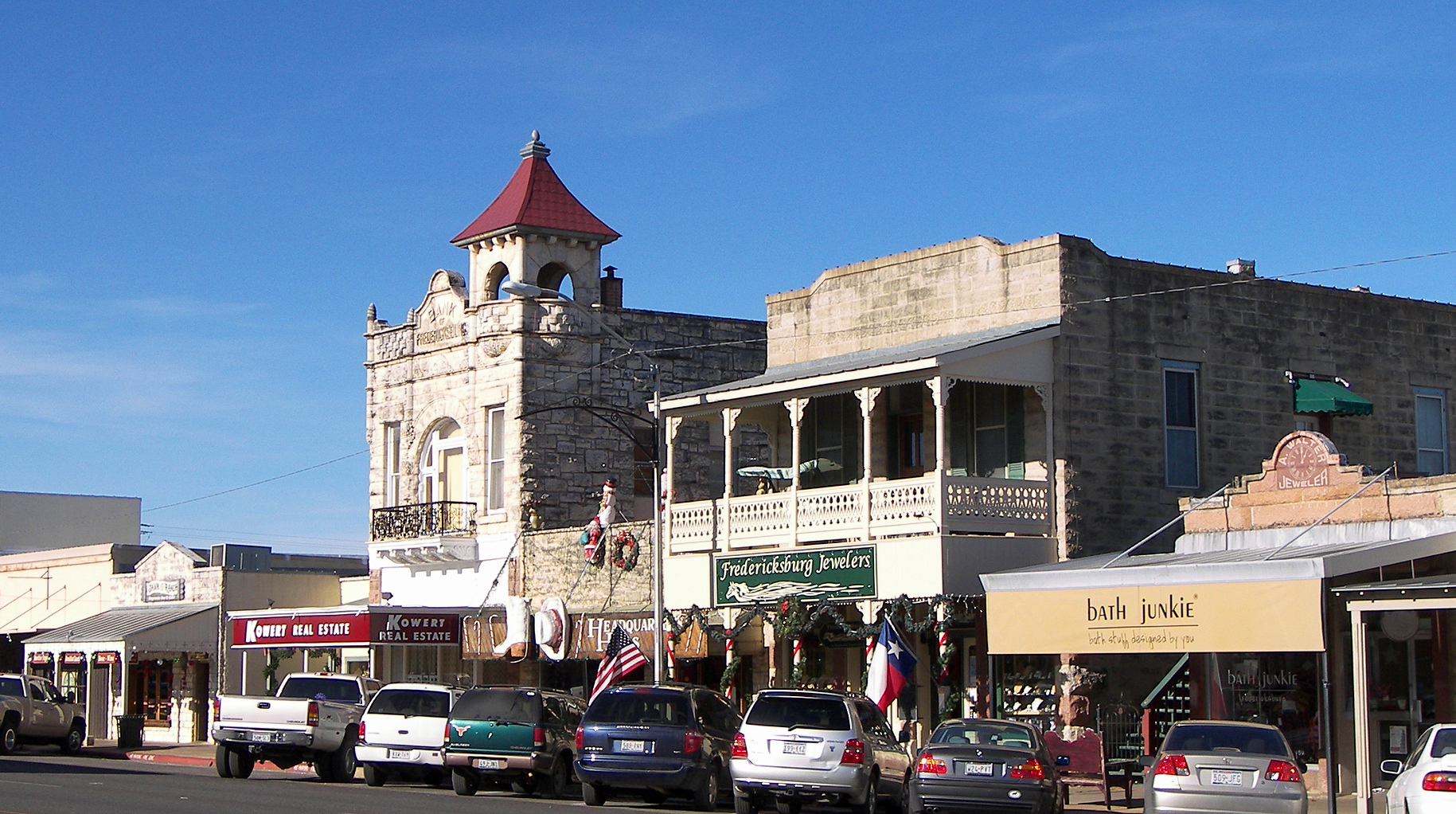
- Fredericksburg Historic District

- Location within Texas Location within the United States
- Location: Roughly bunded by Elk, Schubert, Acorn, and Creek Sts., Fredericksburg, Texas
- Coordinates: 30°16′33″N 98°52′25″W
- Area: 304 acres (123 ha)
- Built: 1846
- Architect: Multiple
- Architectural style: Bungalow/Craftsman, Late Victorian, Vernacular German-Texan
- NRHP reference No.: 70000749
- Added to NRHP: October 14, 1970

The Fredericksburg Historic District is located in Fredericksburg, Texas in Gillespie County. It was added to the National Register of Historic Places in Texas on October 14, 1970 The district area coincides with the original platting of the town by Herman Wilke, and the streets are laid out in a wide grid. The district is bordered approximately on the north by Schubert Street and the south by Creek Street, on the west by Acorn Street and the east by Elk Street. It encompasses one contributing object (sculpture of John O. Meusebach), 367 contributing buildings and 191 non-contributing buildings. Many of the buildings in the historic district have been designated either a Recorded Texas Historic Landmark, and/or added to the National Register of Historic Places listings in Texas.

== See also ==
- History of Fredericksburg, Texas
- Architecture of Fredericksburg, Texas
- National Museum of the Pacific War
- List of museums in the Texas Hill Country
- National Register of Historic Places listings in Gillespie County, Texas
- Recorded Texas Historic Landmarks in Gillespie County
