= Gillespie County Historical Society =

Historical society in Texas, United States

Coordinates: 30.2776°N 98.8776°W

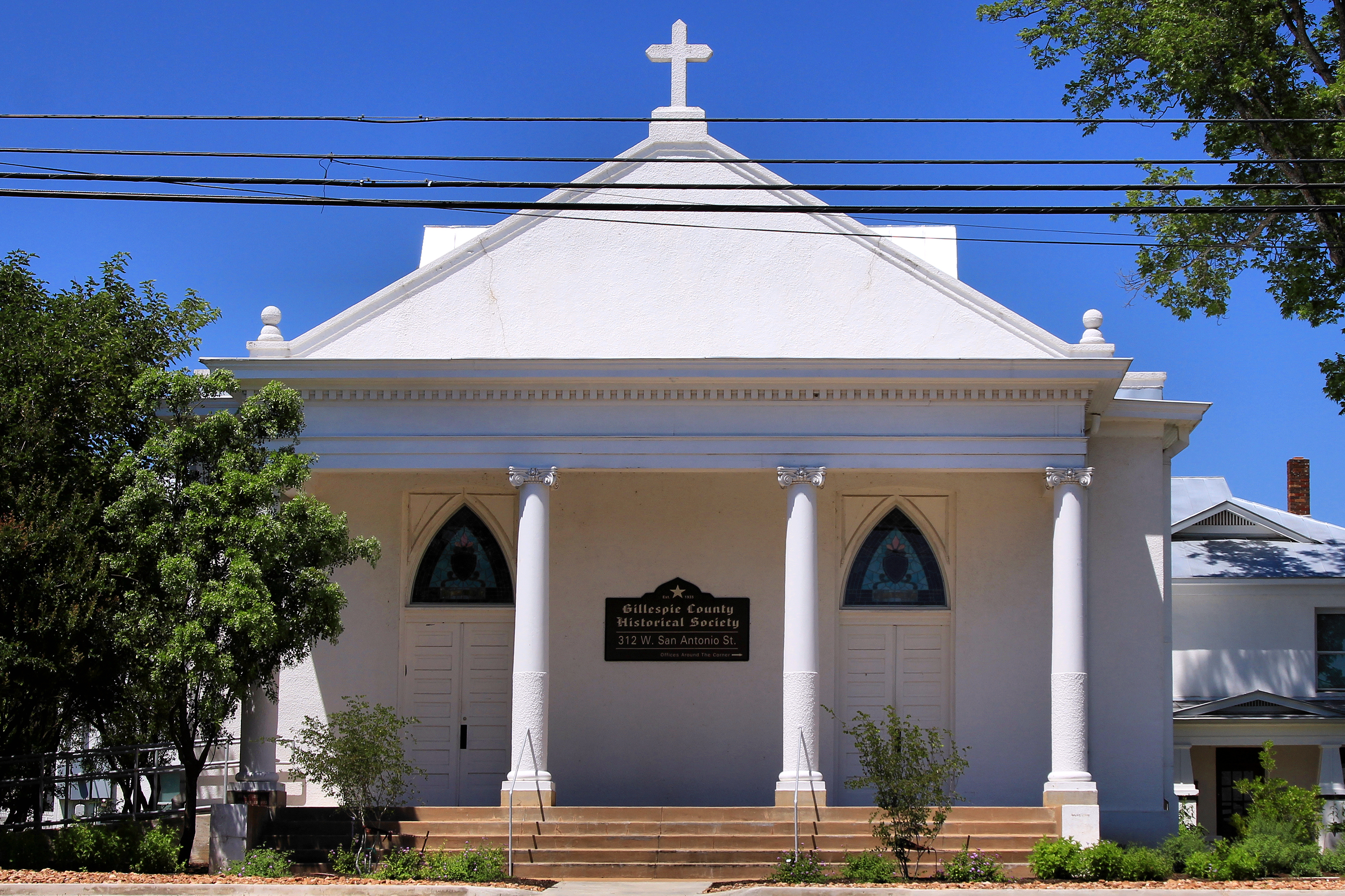
The Gillespie County Historical Society building in Fredericksburg, Texas

The Gillespie County Historical Society is a historical society founded in 1934 serving Gillespie County, Texas. It operates The Pioneer Museum of Fredericksburg, Texas, intended as "a memorial to celebrate a unique community that was created by early settlers to the Texas Hill Country."

Another history museum in Fredericksburg is the Fort Martin Scott Museum, which is run by the Fort Martin Scott Museum Association.

== See also ==
- List of historical societies in Texas
