= General Frank S. Besson-class support vessel =

Type of watercraft in the United States Army

General Frank S. Besson class
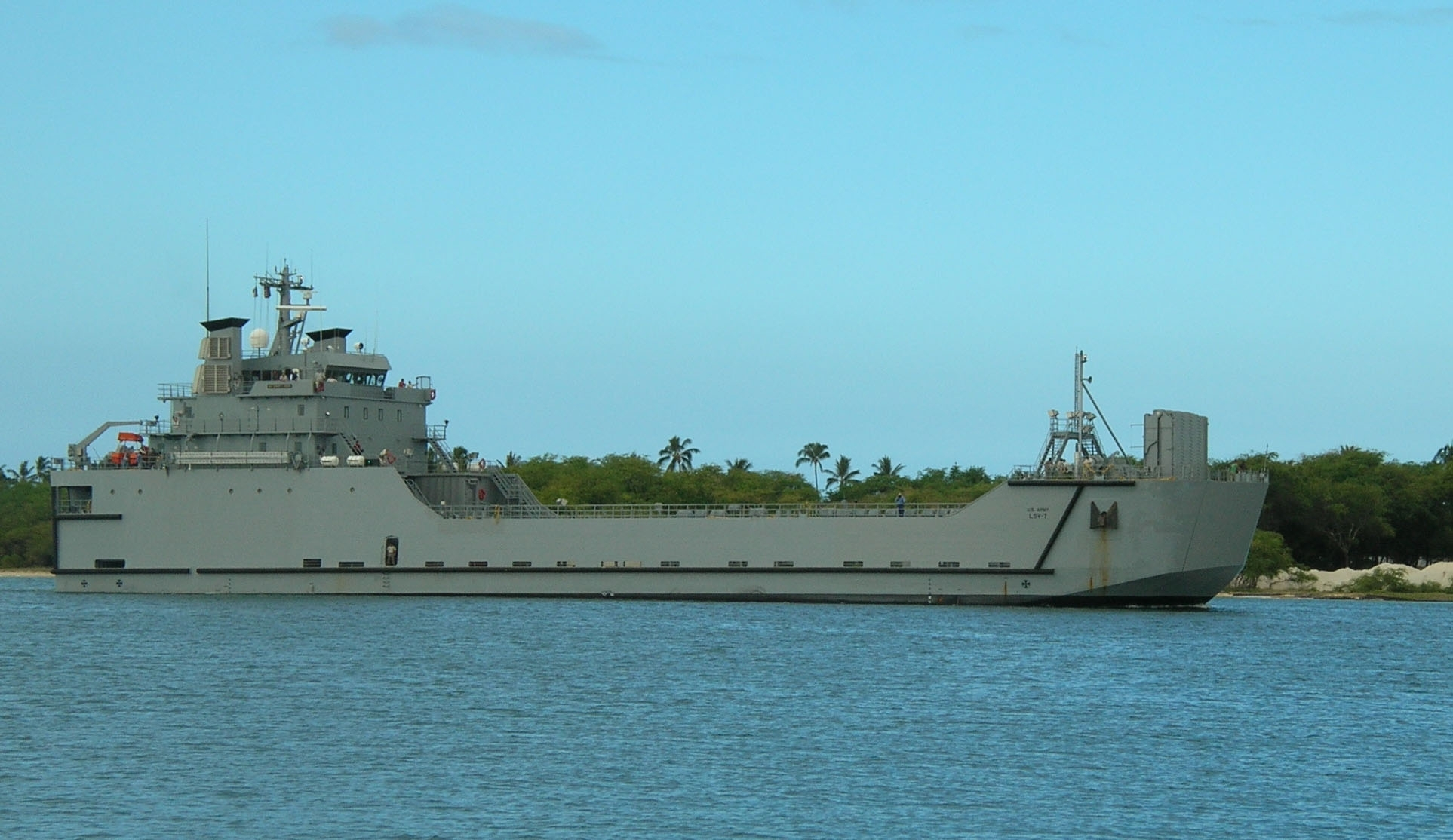
- USAV SSGT Robert T. Kuroda (LSV-7)

Class overview
- Builders: VT Halter Marine, Inc.
- Operators: United States Army; Israeli Navy; Philippine Navy
- Subclasses: SSGT Robert T. Kuroda class; Bacolod City class
- Built: 1987–2006
- In commission: 1988–present
- Planned: 8
- Completed: 8
- Active: 8

General characteristics
- Type: Logistics support vessel
- Displacement: 4,199 long tons (4,266 t)
- Length: 273 ft (83 m)
- Beam: 60 ft (18 m)
- Draft: 12 ft (3.7 m)
- Propulsion: 2 × EMD 16-645E2; 1,950 hp (1,454 kW) each at 999 rpm
- Speed: 12.5 knots (23.2 km/h; 14.4 mph) light; 11.5 knots (21.3 km/h; 13.2 mph) loaded
- Range: 8,200 nmi (15,200 km; 9,400 mi) light; 6,500 nmi (12,000 km; 7,500 mi) loaded
- Complement: 8 officers, 23 enlisted

General Frank S. Besson-class logistics support vessels (LSV) are the largest powered watercraft in the United States Army, and are designed to give the Army a global strategic capability to deliver its vehicles and cargo. They have bow and stern ramps and can beach themselves, allowing them to discharge cargo in shallow water. The ships can carry any vehicle in the US Army inventory, including up to 15 M1 Abrams tanks.

== Design ==
Named in honor of Gen. Frank S. Besson Jr., former Chief of Transportation, U.S. Army, these ships have bow and stern ramps and the ability to beach themselves, giving them the ability to discharge 816 tonnes of vehicles and cargo over the shore in as little as 1.2 m of water, or 1,814 tonnes as an intra-theater line haul roll-on/roll-off cargo ship. The vessel's cargo deck is designed to handle any vehicle in the US Army inventory and can carry up to 15 M1 Abrams-series main battle tanks or 82 ISO standard containers.

== Subclasses ==
The Robert T. Kuroda is the lead vessel of a new subclass of the Frank S. Besson class called LSV (MOD). The Kuroda, named after Robert T. Kuroda, and its sister ship, the Smalls, named after Robert Smalls, are generally similar to the rest of the class except that the ships are 42 feet (13 m) longer than the other ships of the class. This is due to a more streamlined "visor" bow that hides the front ramp and allows for the vessels to move through rough water more easily. While these ships have the same main deck area as the rest of the class—10,500 square feet (980 m^{2})— however they displace 6,000 short tons (5,400 t), can make 10,000 U.S. gallons (38,000 L) of water a day, have incinerators for burning trash, are taller than the traditional Besson-class LSVs, and have 25% more horsepower. The ship has a range of more than 5,500 nautical miles (10,200 km) and can deploy fully provisioned worldwide at a speed of 12 knots (22 km/h) carrying a standard port-opening package weighing 1,000 short tons (910 t).

== Related classes ==
The Philippine Navy commissioned two Bacolod City-class logistics support vessels during the early 1990s. These ships were based on a helicopter-capable variant of the General Frank S. Besson Jr.-class logistics support vessel.

The Israeli Navy operates two US-built variants of the class, INS Nahshon & INS Komemiyut.

== Ships ==
- USAV General Frank S. Besson Jr. (LSV-1) – 335th Transportation Detachment, 7th Expeditionary Transportation Brigade
- USAV CW3 Harold C. Clinger (LSV-2) – 489th Transportation Detachment, USAR
- USAV General Brehon B. Somervell (LSV-3) – 805th Transportation Detachment, 8th Theater Sustainment Command
- USAV Lt. General William B. Bunker (LSV-4) – 1099th Transportation Detachment, 7th Expeditionary Transportation Brigade
- USAV Major General Charles P. Gross (LSV-5) – 411th Transportation Detachment, 1st Theater Sustainment Command
- USAV SP4 James A. Loux (LSV-6) – USAR
- USAV SSGT Robert T. Kuroda (LSV-7) – USAR
- USAV Major General Robert Smalls (LSV-8) – 605th Transportation Detachment, 8th Theater Sustainment Command

== Operators ==
- United States Army
- Israeli Navy
- Philippine Navy

== Gallery ==
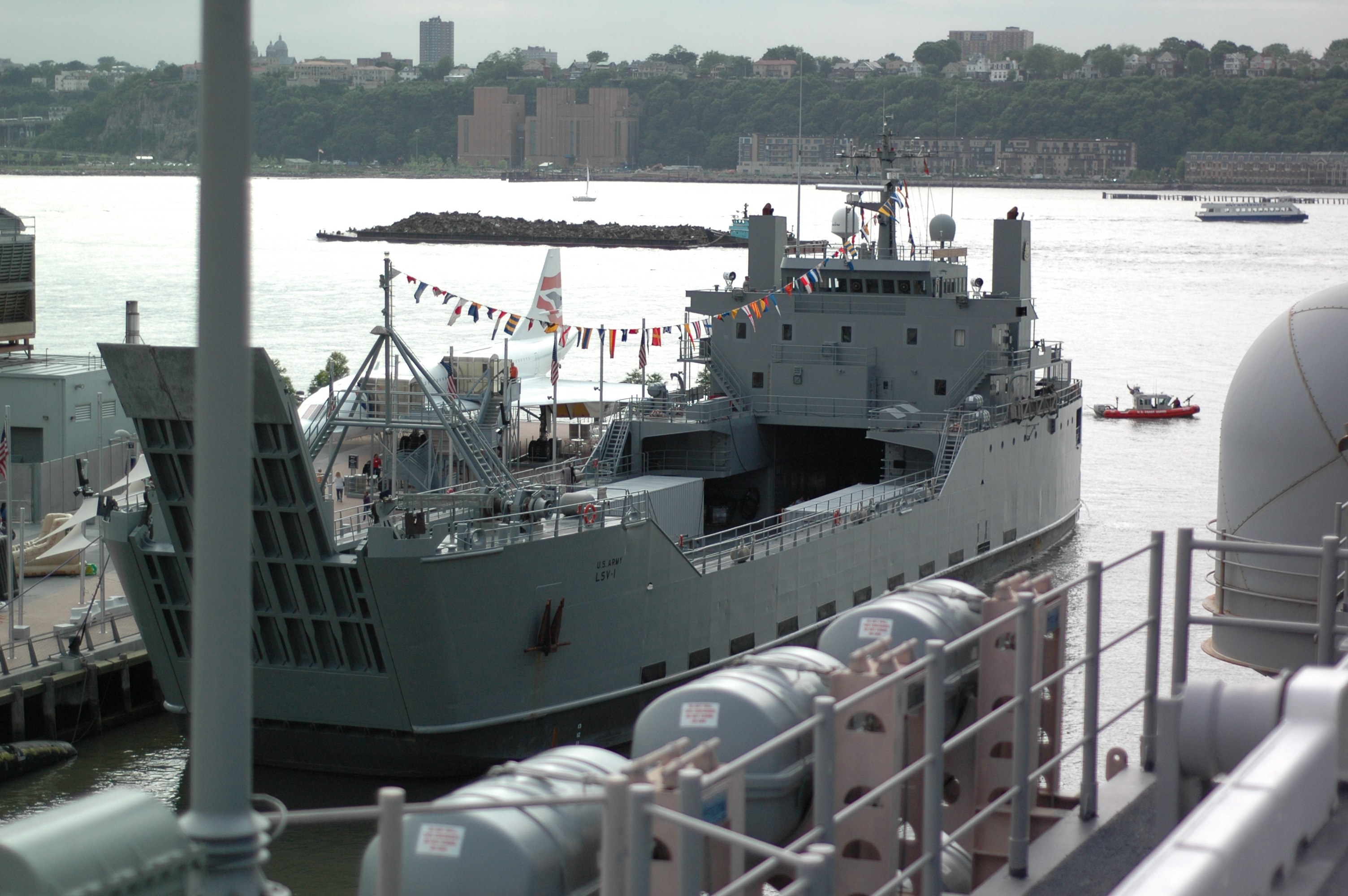
USAV General Frank S. Besson Jr (LSV-1) docked across from the USS Intrepid in Manhattan during Fleet Week 2010.

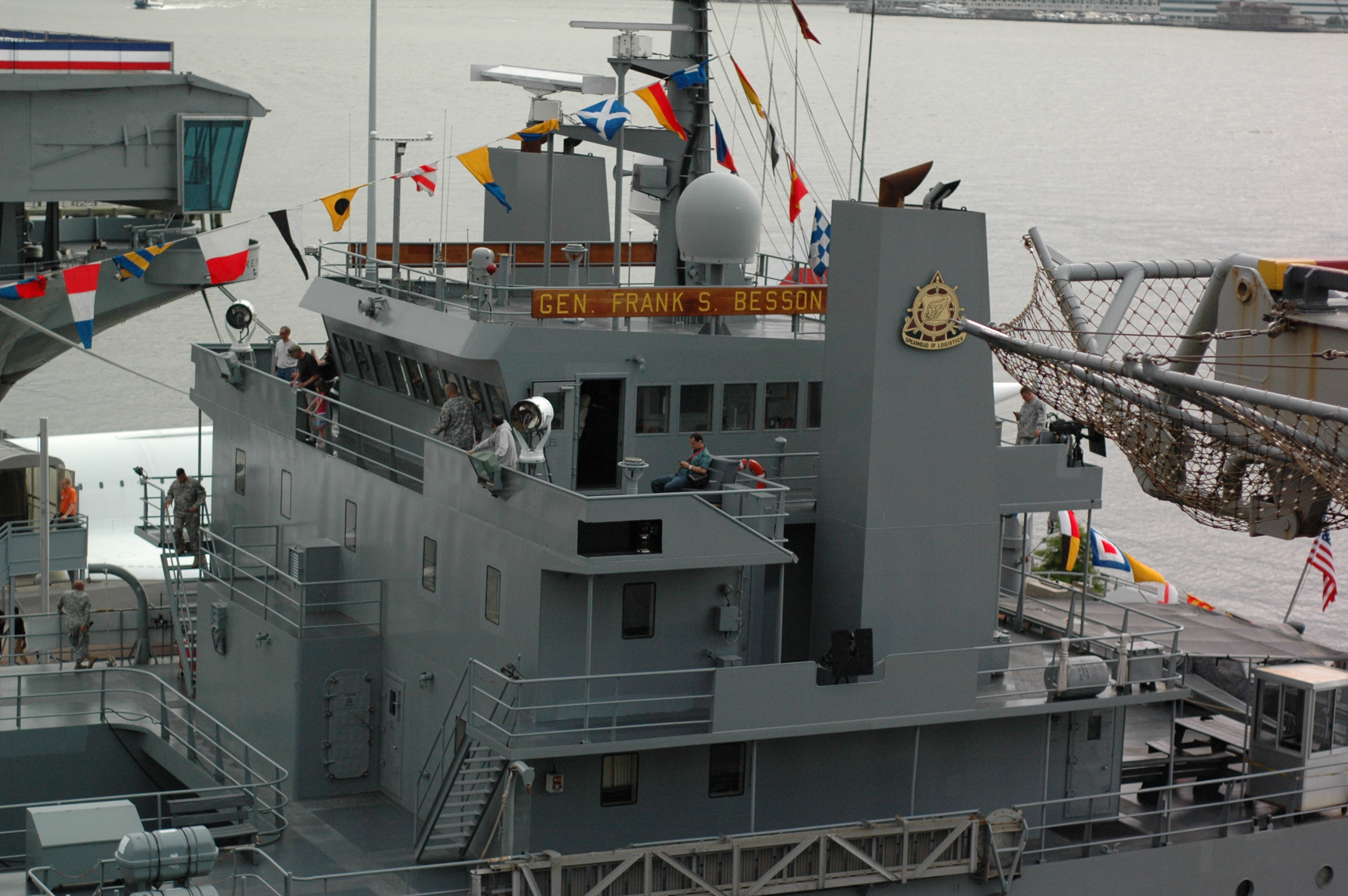
USAV General Frank S. Besson Jr (LSV-1)

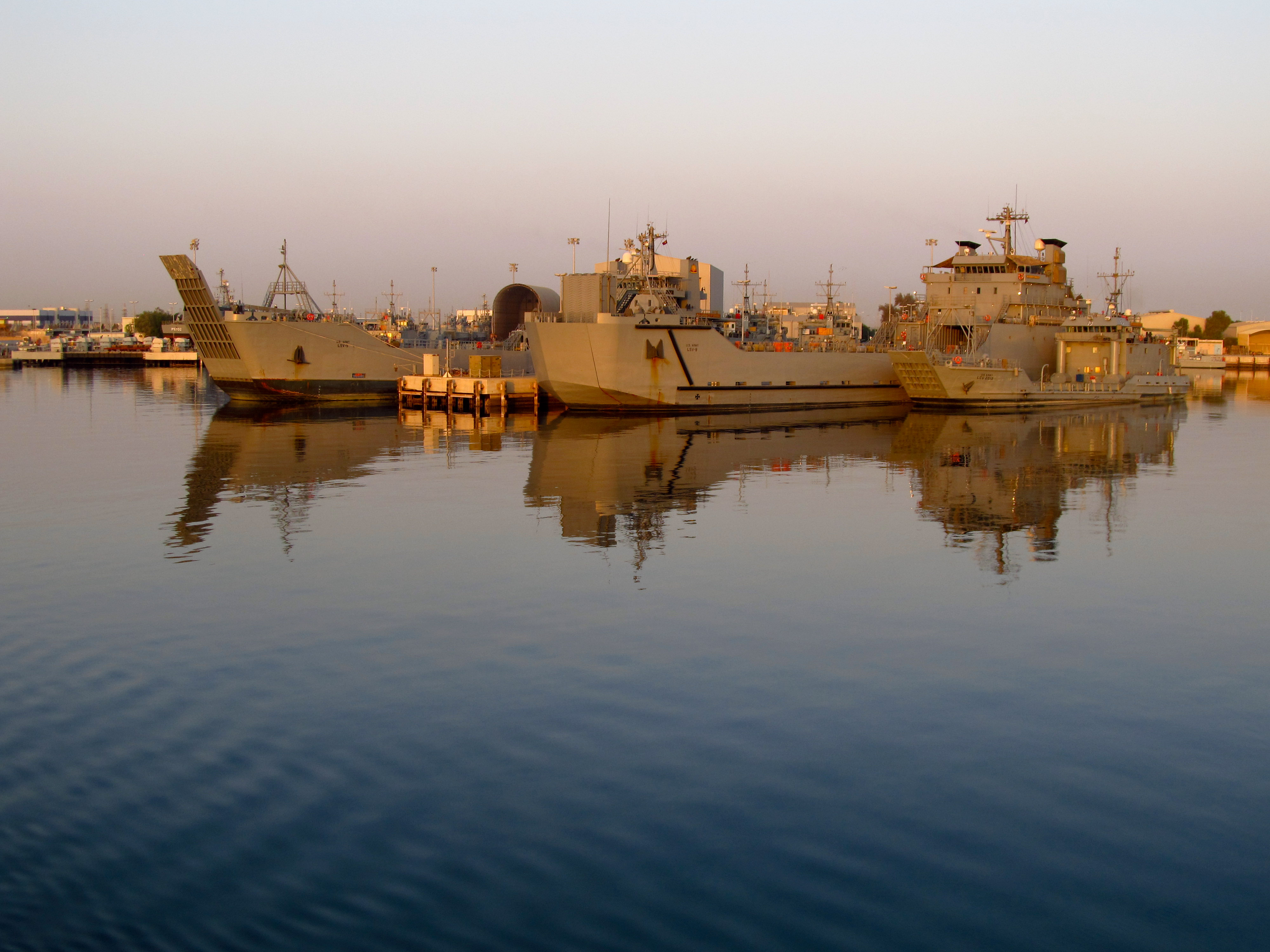
From L to R: USAV MG Charles P. Gross (LSV-5), USAV MG Robert Smalls (LSV-8), and the USAV Churubusco (LCU-2013). Photo was taken while aboard the USAV Five Forks (LCU-2018)

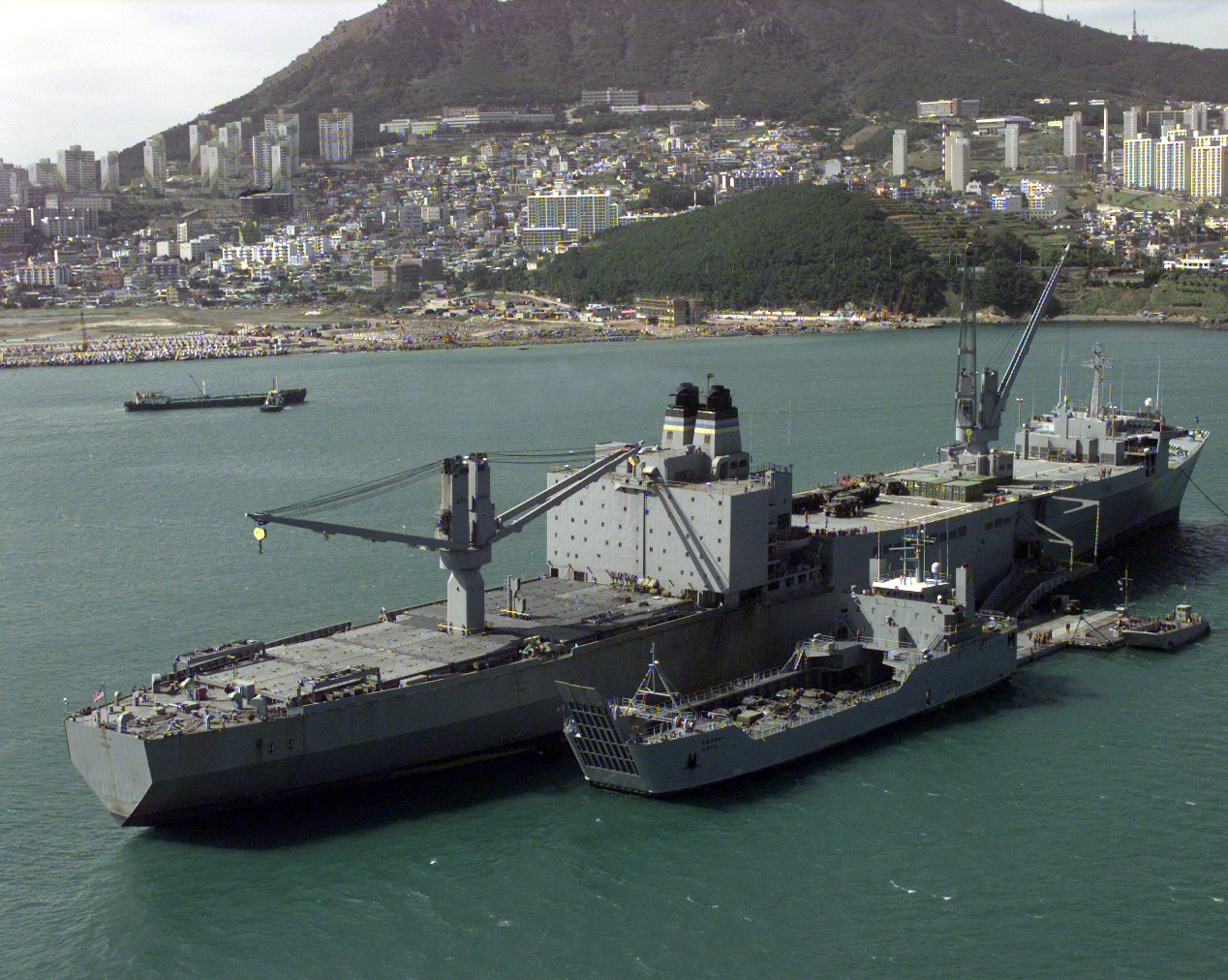
LSV alongside USNS Pollux (T-AKR-290) in the port of Pusan, South Korea. Pollux is loading vehicles onto the LSV which will then transport them to shore.
