= USAV CW3 Harold C. Clinger =

General Frank S. Besson Jr. class support vessel of the US Navy

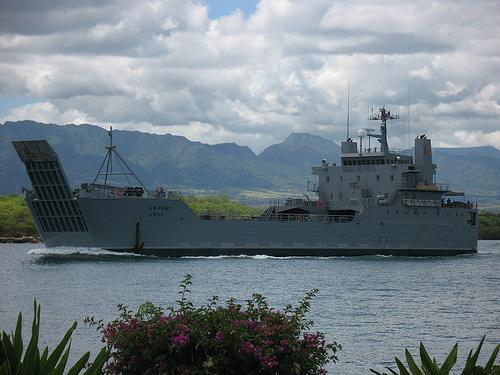
- USAV CW3 Harold C. Clinger on 1 July 2014

History

United States
- Name: CW3 Harold C. Clinger
- Namesake: Harold C. Clinger
- Operator: United States Army
- Builder: VT Halter Marine, Pascagoula
- Acquired: 18 December 1987
- Commissioned: 1988
- Identification: MMSI number: 368728000; Callsign: AAED; Pennant number: LSV-2
- Status: Active

General characteristics
- Class & type: General Frank S. Besson class roll-on/roll-off
- Displacement: 4,199 long tons (4,266 t)
- Length: 273 ft (83 m)
- Beam: 60 ft (18 m)
- Draft: 12 ft (3.7 m)
- Propulsion: 2 × EMD 16-645E2; 1,950 hp (1,454 kW) each at 999 rpm
- Speed: 12.5 knots (23.2 km/h; 14.4 mph) light; 11.5 knots (21.3 km/h; 13.2 mph) loaded
- Range: 8,200 nmi (15,200 km) light; 6,500 nmi (12,000 km) loaded
- Complement: 8 officers, 23 enlisted

USAV CW3 Harold C. Clinger (LSV-2) is a General Frank S. Besson Jr.-class roll-on/roll-off of US Army.

== Design ==
Named in honor of Gen. Frank S. Besson Jr., former Chief of Transportation, U.S. Army, these ships have bow and stern ramps and the ability to beach themselves, giving them the ability to discharge 900 short tons of vehicles and cargo over the shore in as little as four feet of water, or 2,000 short tons as an intra-theater line haul roll-on/roll-off cargo ship. The vessel's cargo deck is designed to handle any vehicle in the US Army inventory and can carry up to 15 M1 Abrams main battle tanks or 82 ISO standard containers.

== Construction and career ==
She was acquired by the US Army on 21 June 2006 and commissioned in 1988 into the 489th Transportation Detachment, United States Army Reserve.

She is named after US Army Chief Warrant Officer 3 Harold C. "Spike" Clinger.

== Gallery ==
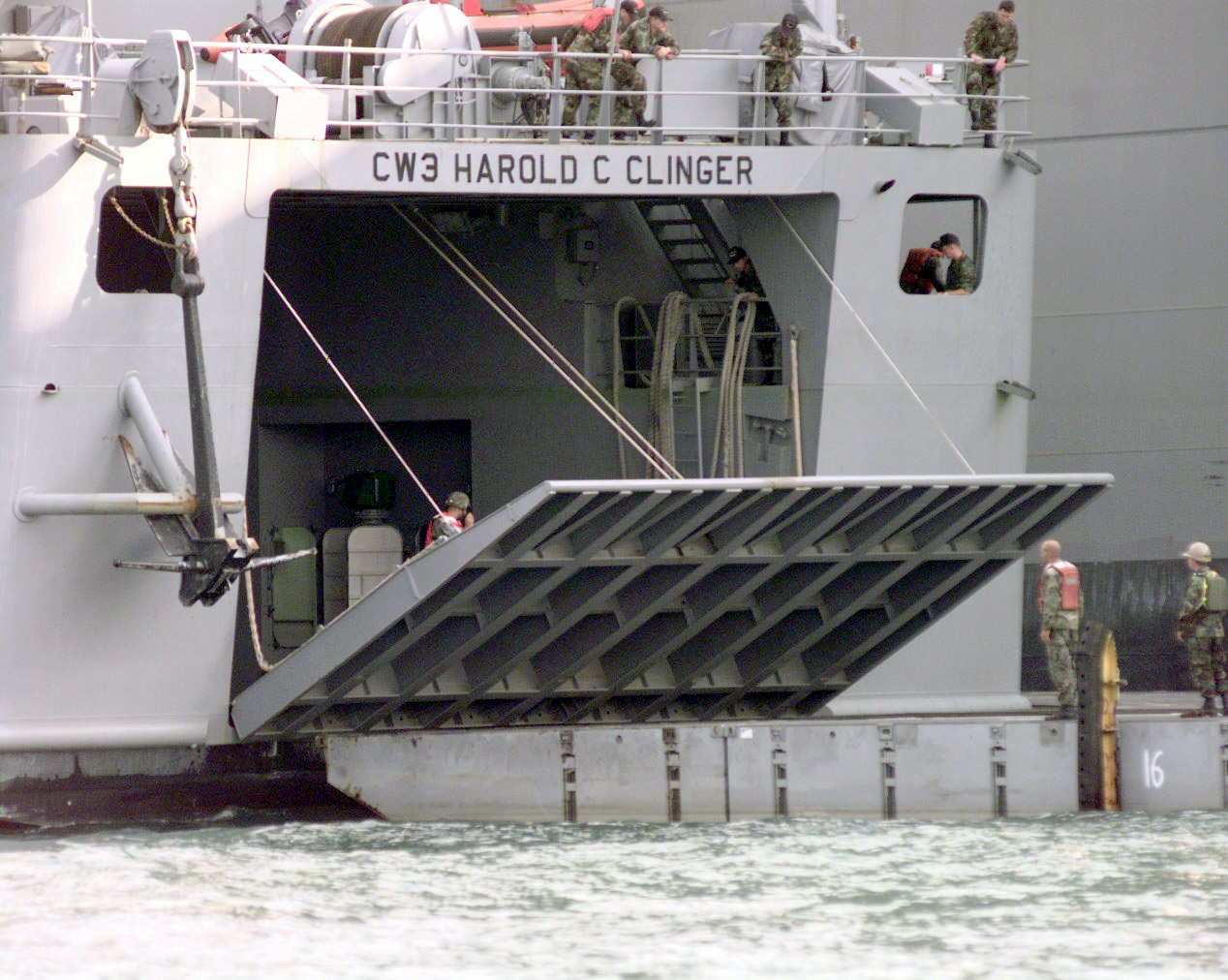
USAV CW3 Harold C. Clinger on 18 October 1998

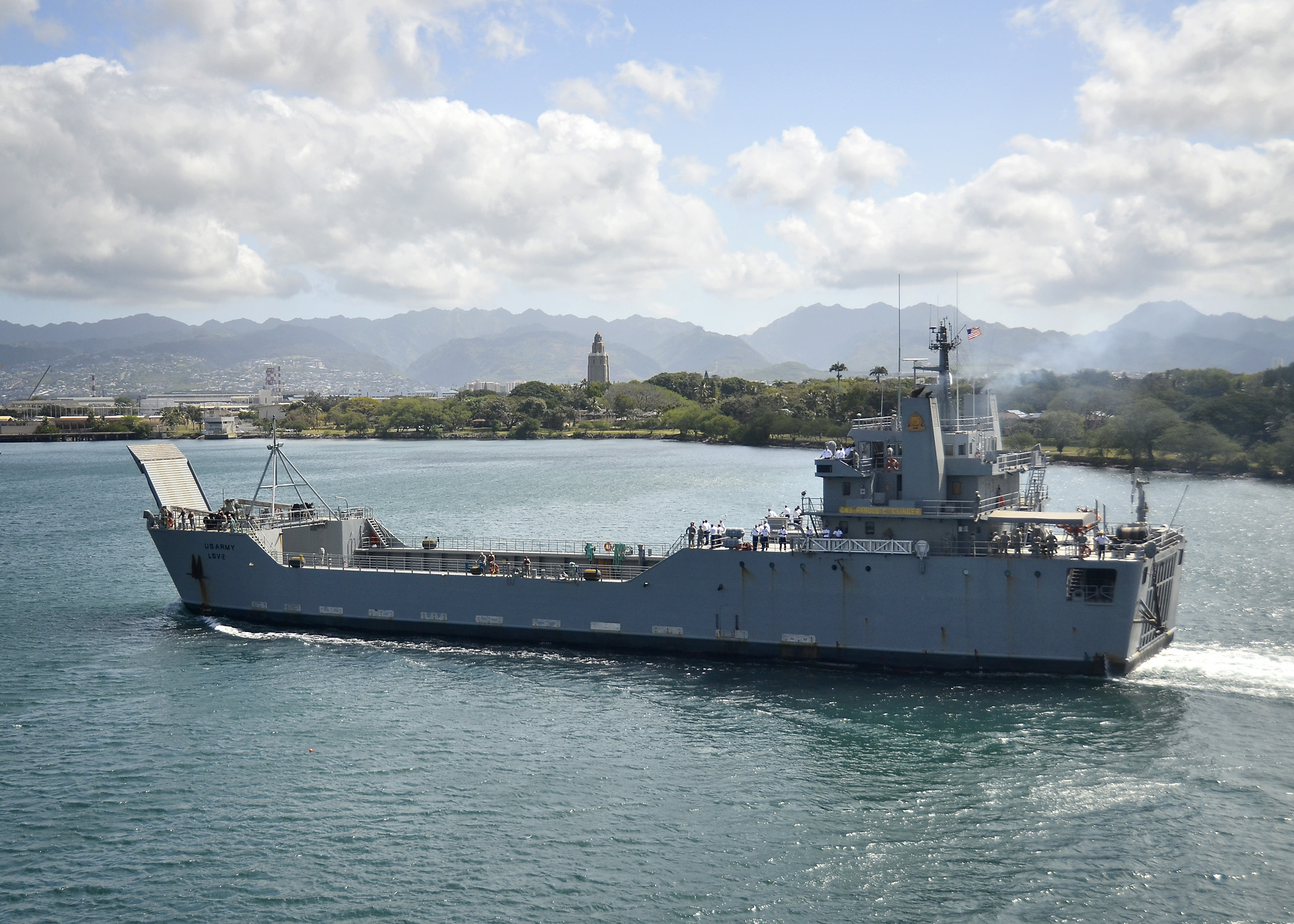
USAV CW3 Harold C. Clinger during RIMPAC 2014

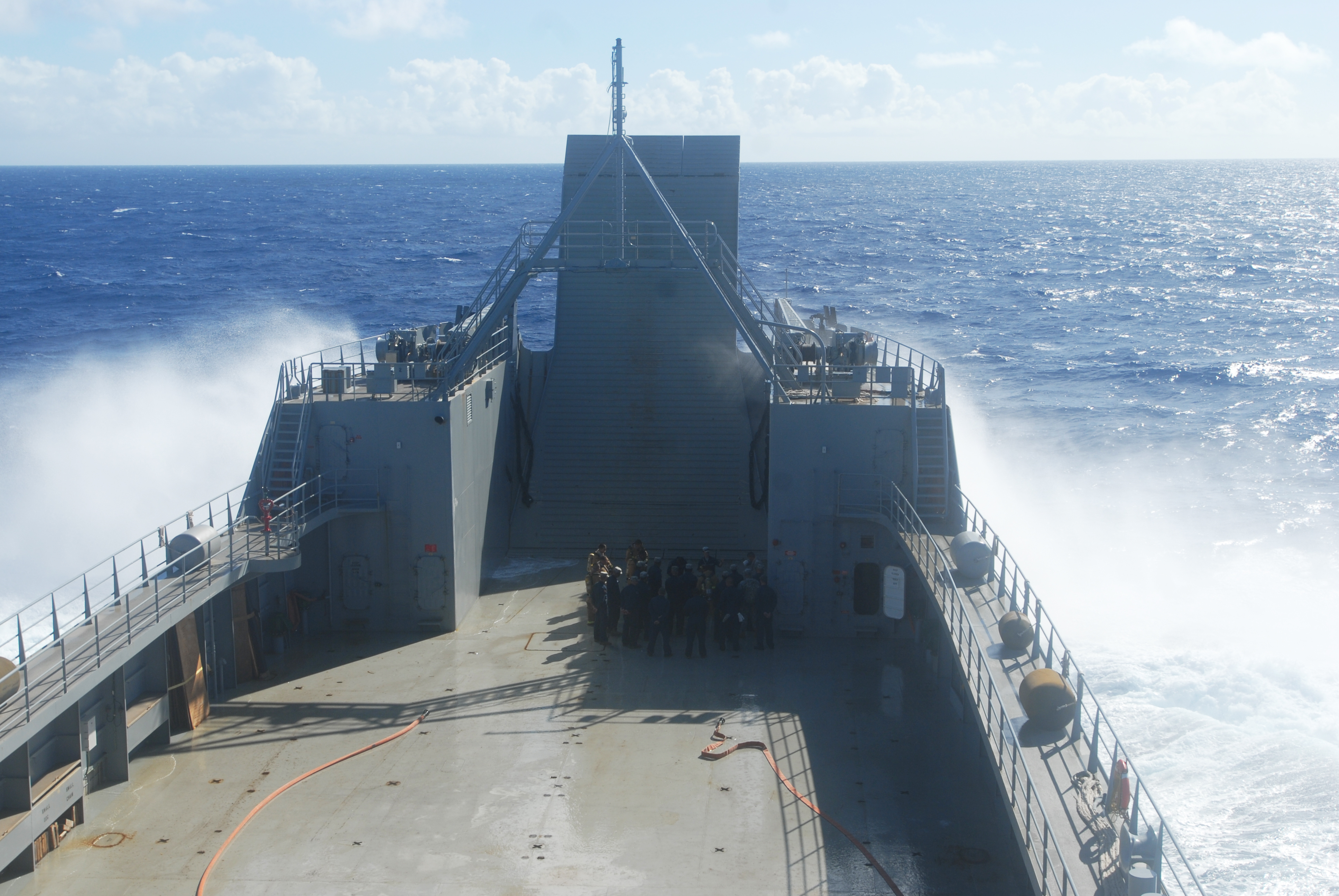

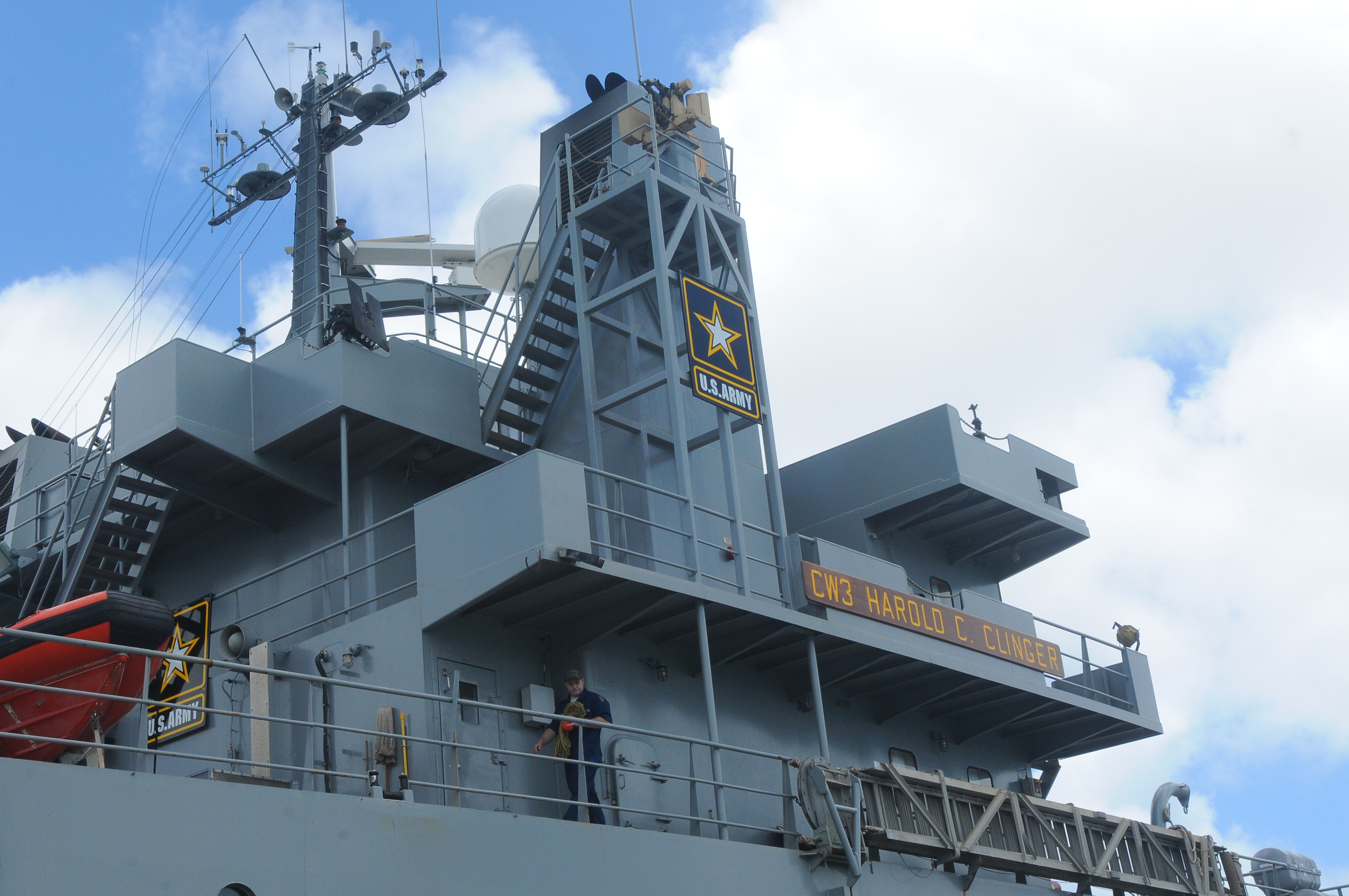

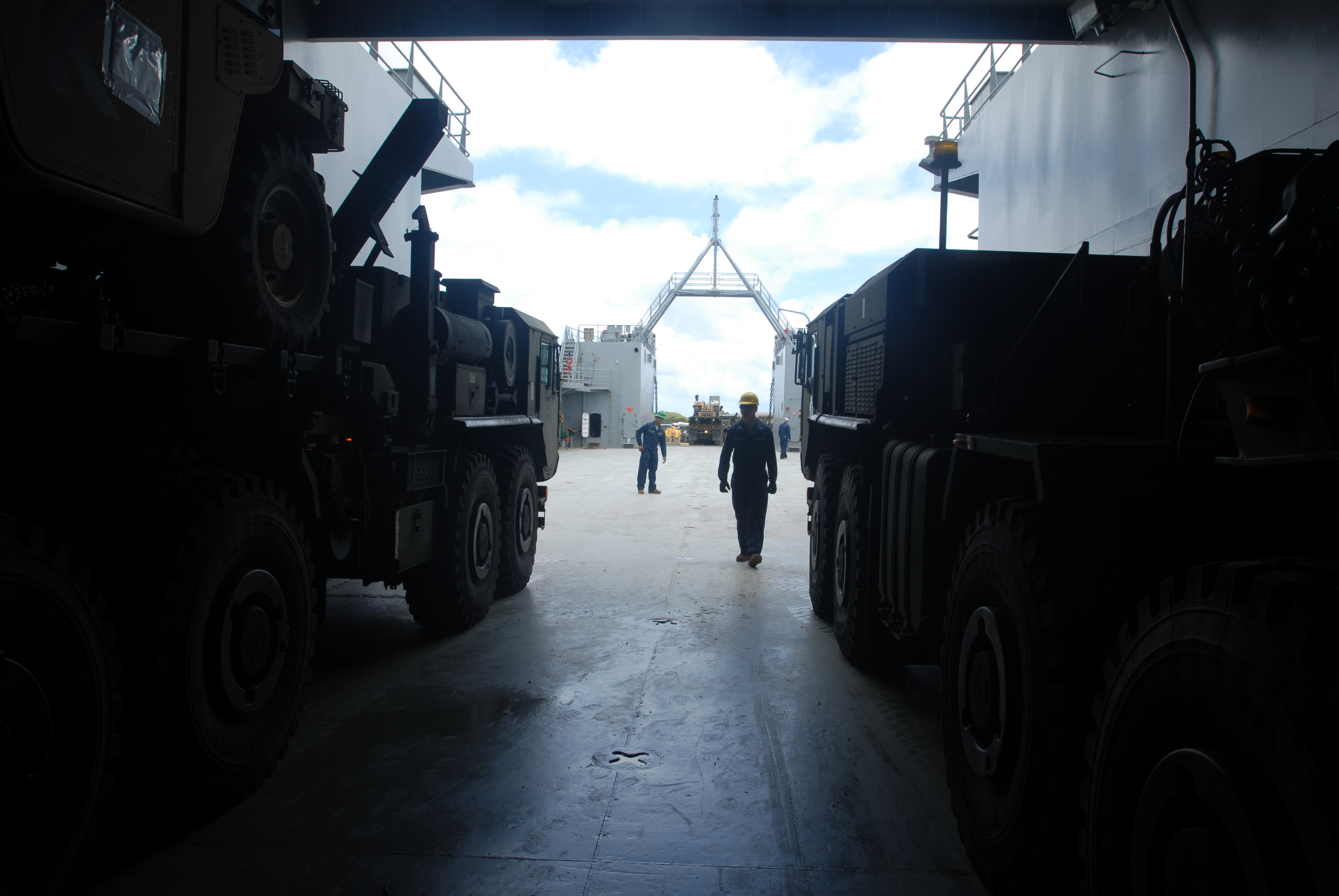

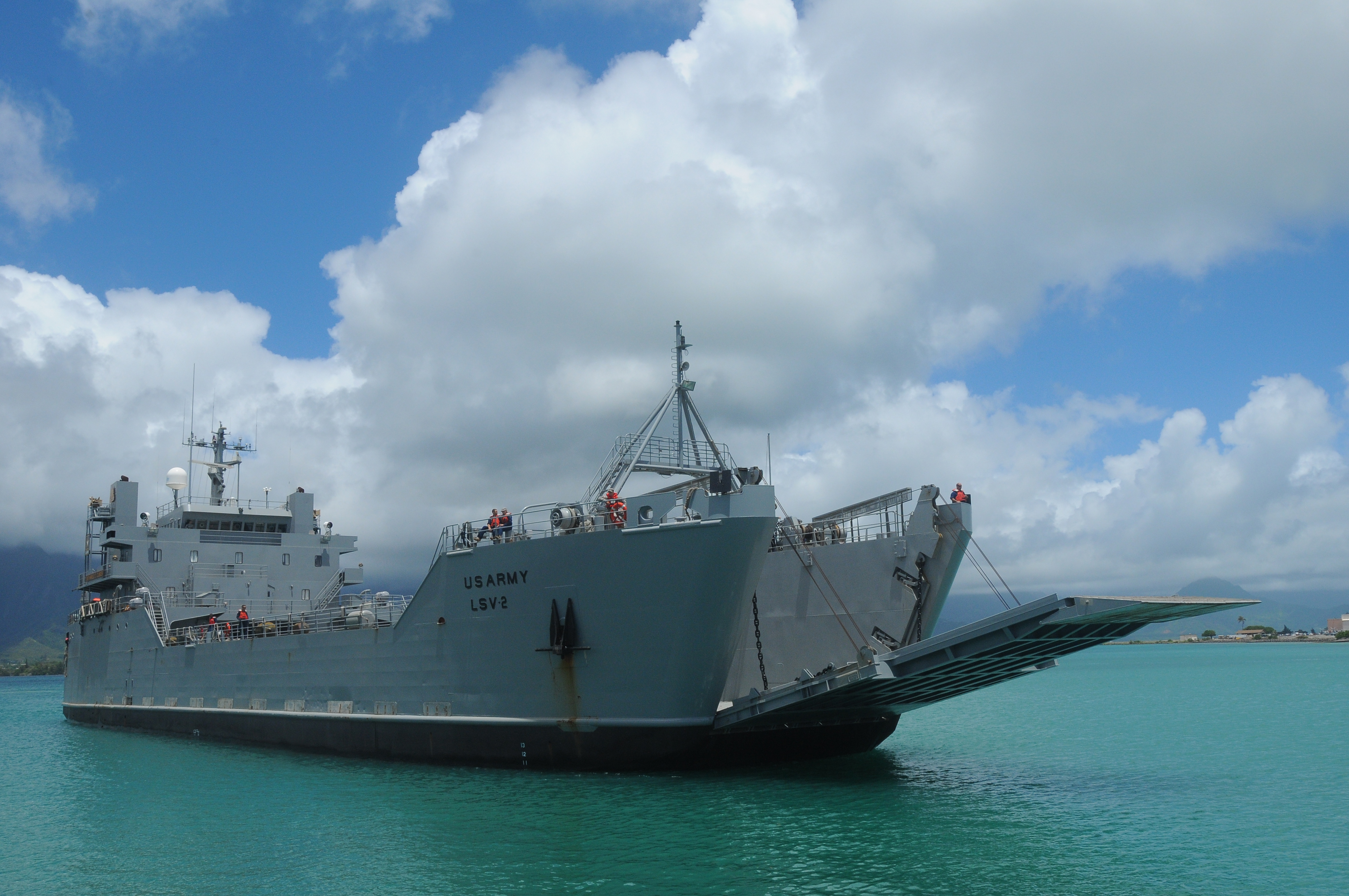

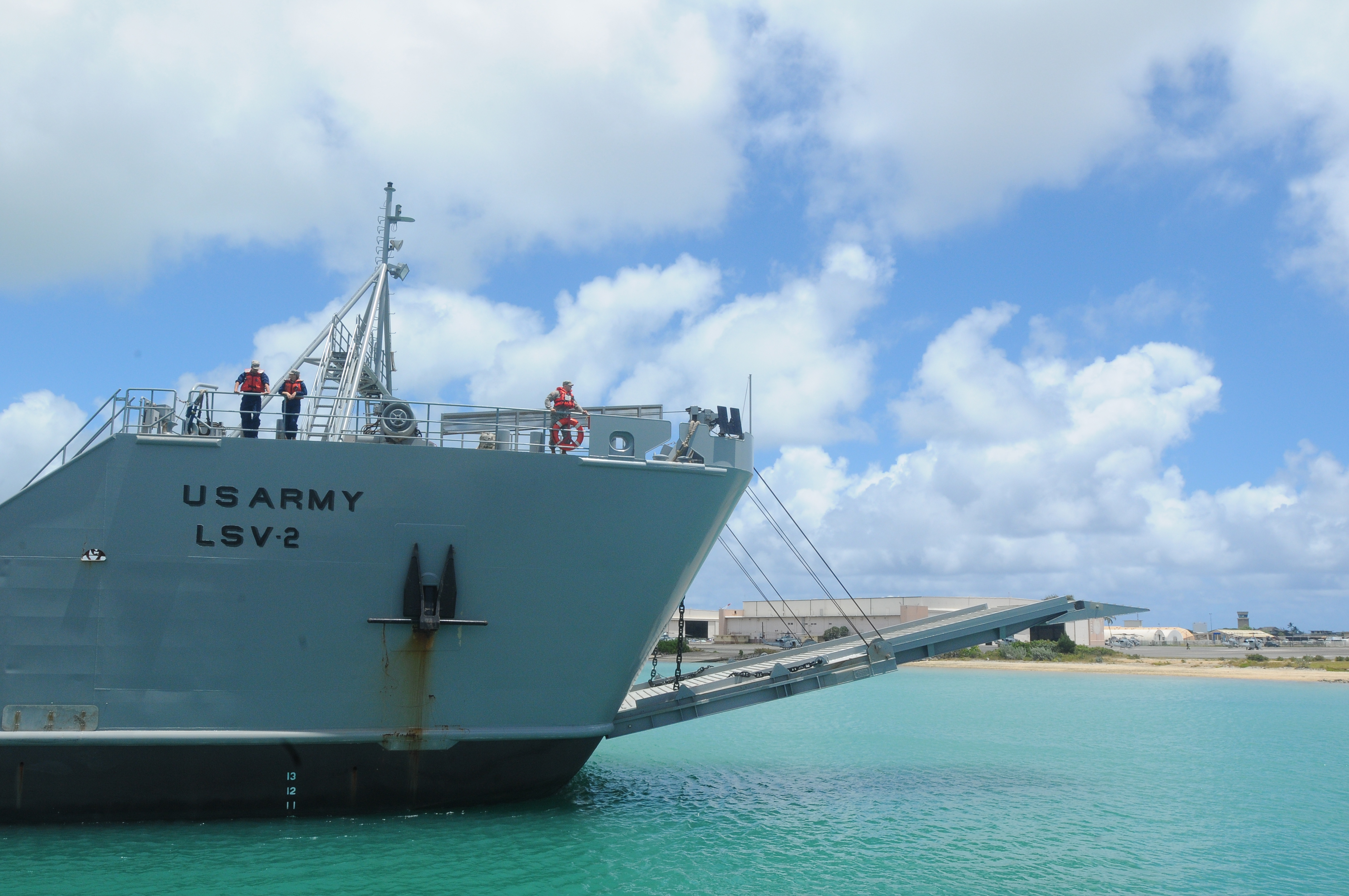

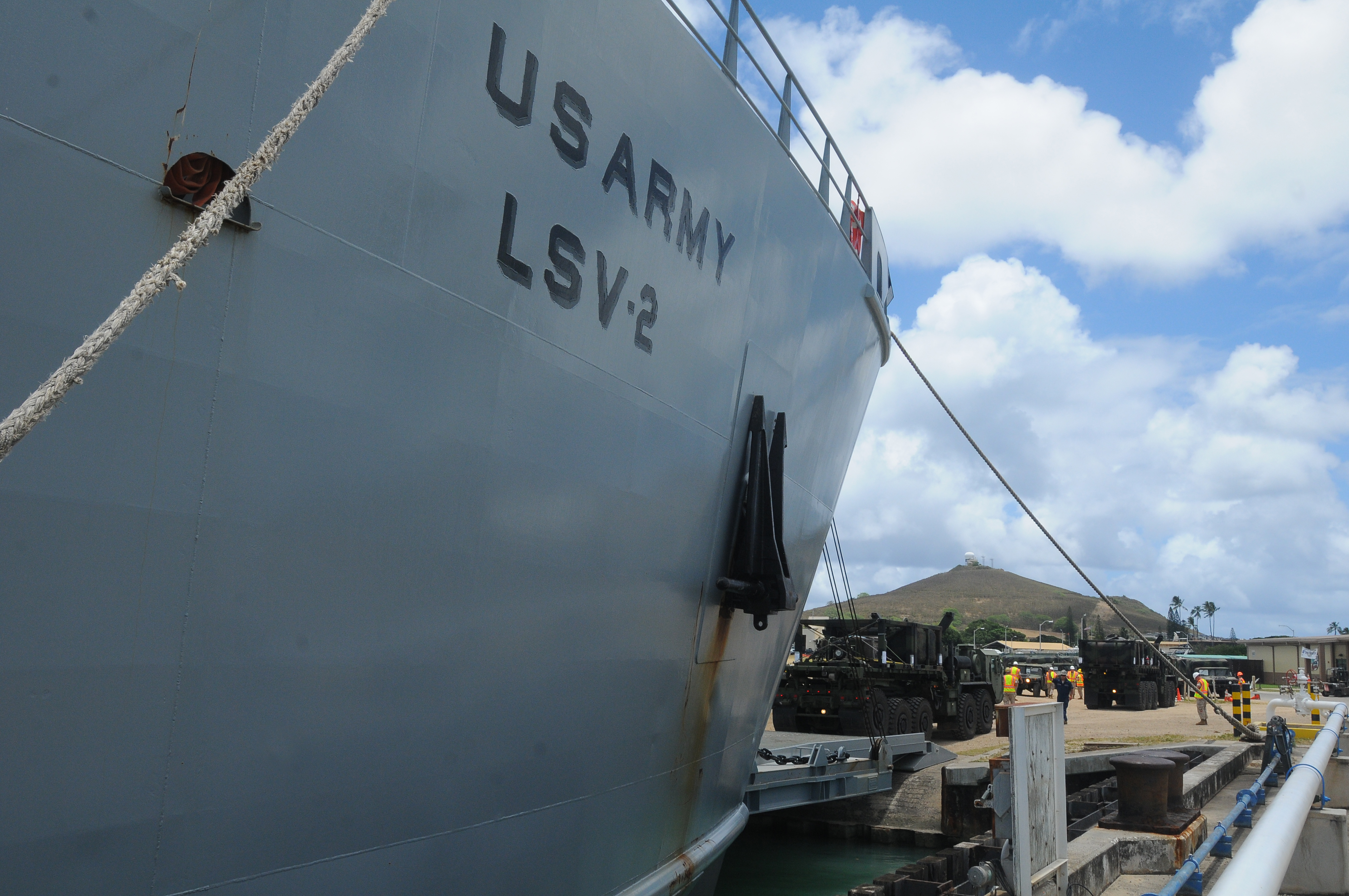

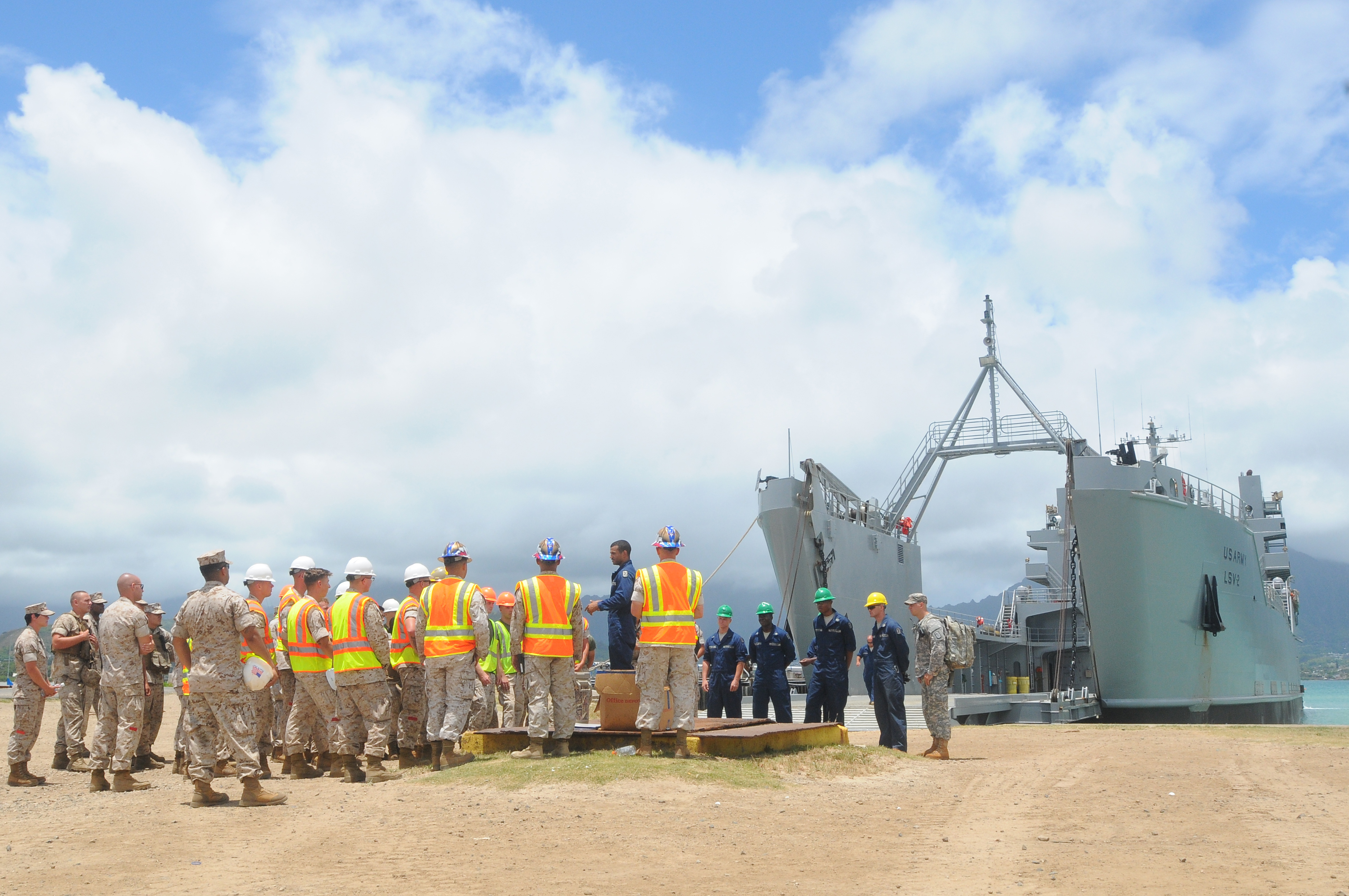

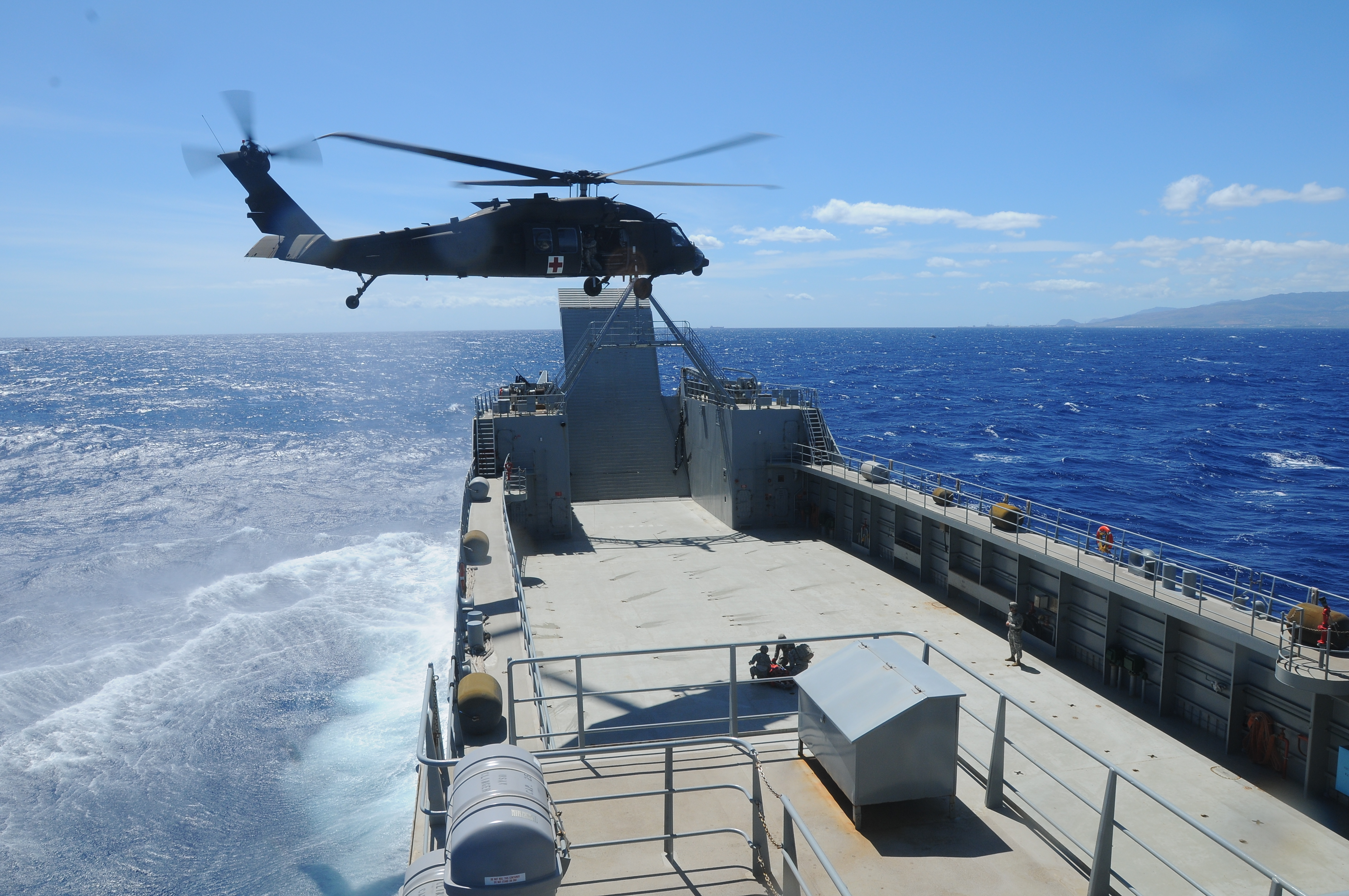

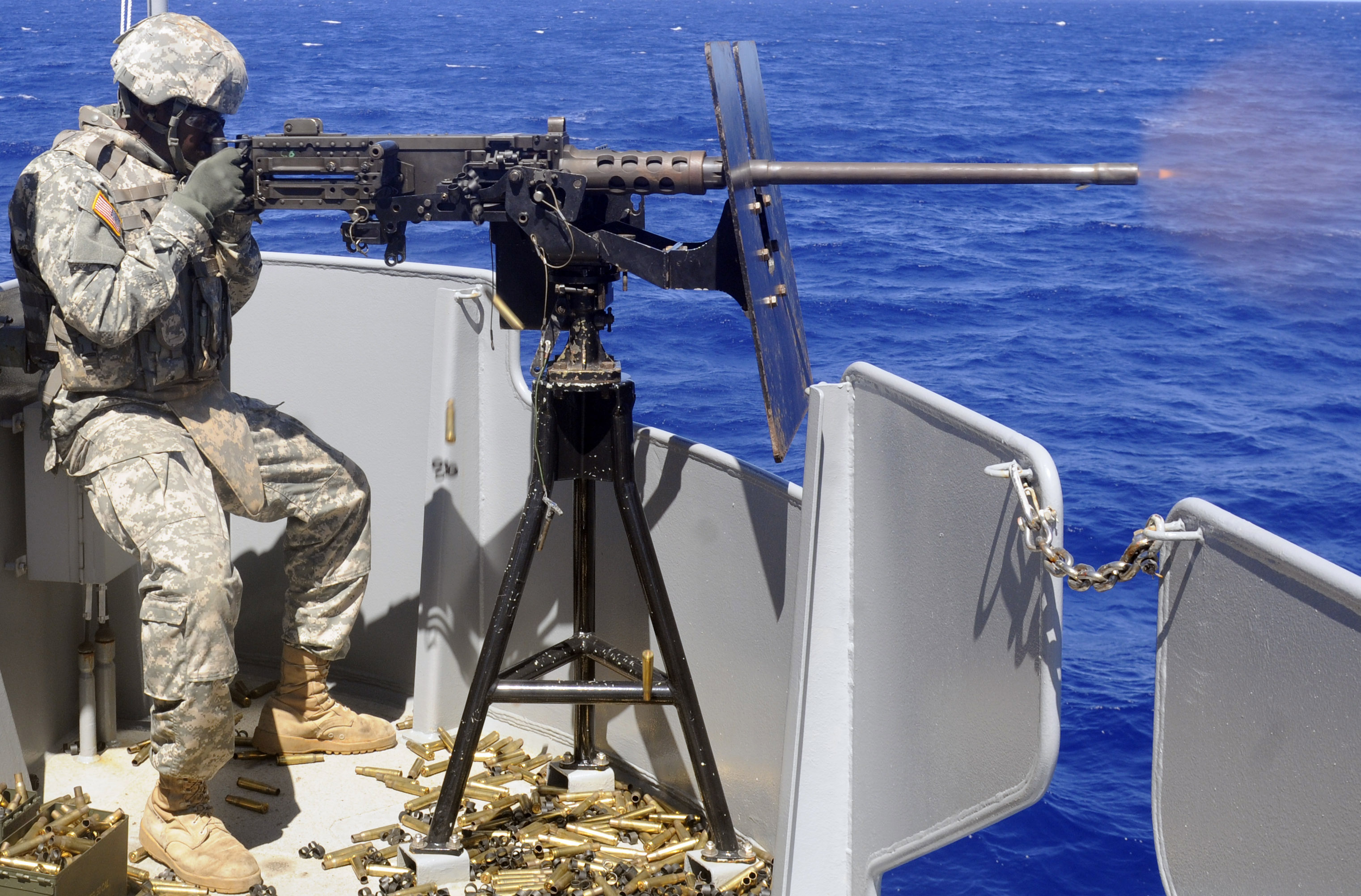
