= USAV SP4 James A. Loux =

General Frank S. Besson Jr. class support vessel of the US Navy

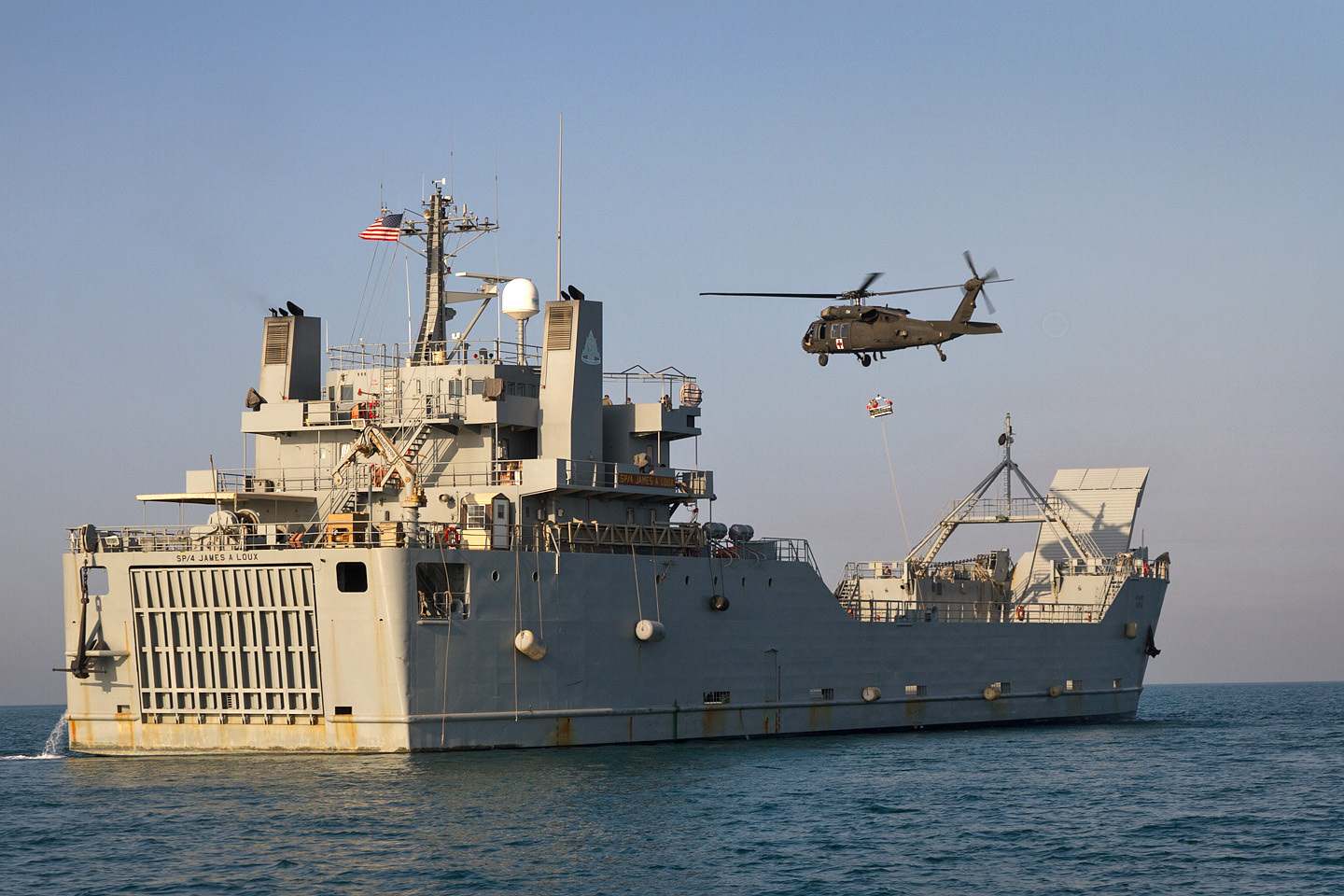
- USAV SP4 James A. Loux on 7 November 2013

History

United States
- Name: SP4 James A. Loux
- Namesake: James A. Loux
- Operator: United States Army
- Builder: VT Halter Marine, Pascagoula
- Acquired: 30 September 1994
- Commissioned: 1994
- Identification: MMSI number: 366999404; Callsign: AAFA; Pennant number: LSV-6
- Status: Active

General characteristics
- Class & type: General Frank S. Besson class roll-on/roll-off
- Displacement: 4,199 long tons (4,266 t)
- Length: 273 ft (83 m)
- Beam: 60 ft (18 m)
- Draft: 12 ft (3.7 m)
- Propulsion: 2 × EMD 16-645E2; 1,950 hp (1,454 kW) each at 999 rpm
- Speed: 12.5 knots (23.2 km/h; 14.4 mph) light; 11.5 knots (21.3 km/h; 13.2 mph) loaded
- Range: 8,200 nmi (15,200 km) light; 6,500 nmi (12,000 km) loaded
- Complement: 8 officers, 23 enlisted

USAV SP4 James A. Loux (LSV-6) is a General Frank S. Besson Jr.-class roll-on/roll-off ship of the US Army.

== Design ==
Named in honor of Gen. Frank S. Besson Jr., former Chief of Transportation, U.S. Army, these ships have bow and stern ramps and the ability to beach themselves, giving them the ability to discharge 900 short tons of vehicles and cargo over the shore in as little as four feet of water, or 2,000 short tons as an intra-theater line haul roll-on/roll-off cargo ship. The vessel's cargo deck is designed to handle any vehicle in the US Army inventory and can carry up to 15 M1 Abrams main battle tanks or 82 ISO standard containers.

== Construction and career ==
She was acquired by the US Army on 30 September 1994 and commissioned in 1994 into the United States Army Reserve.

The ship is named after Specialist James A. Loux (10 February 1950 –- 5 April 1971) a Vietnam War US Army Silver Star recipient.

== Gallery ==
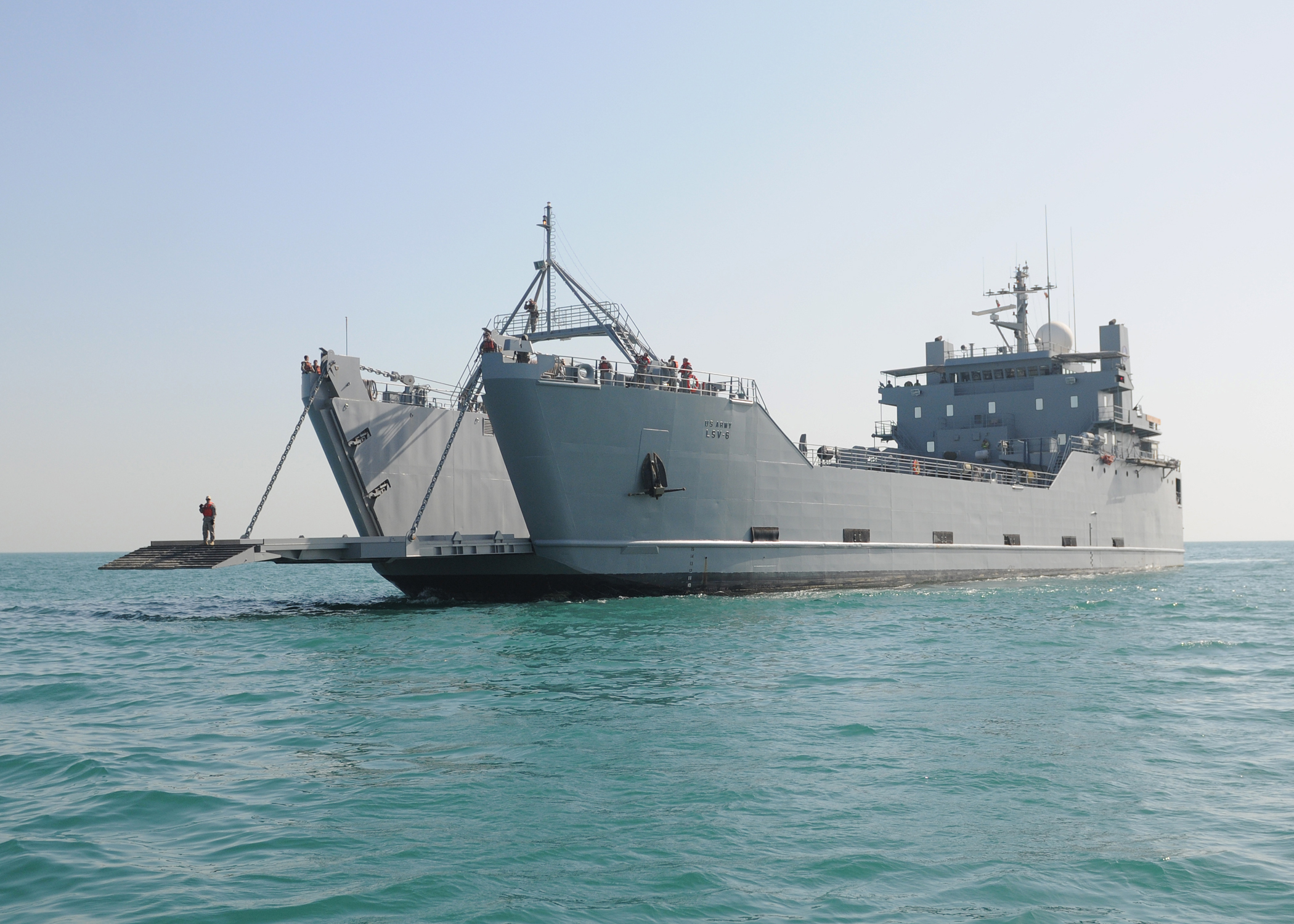

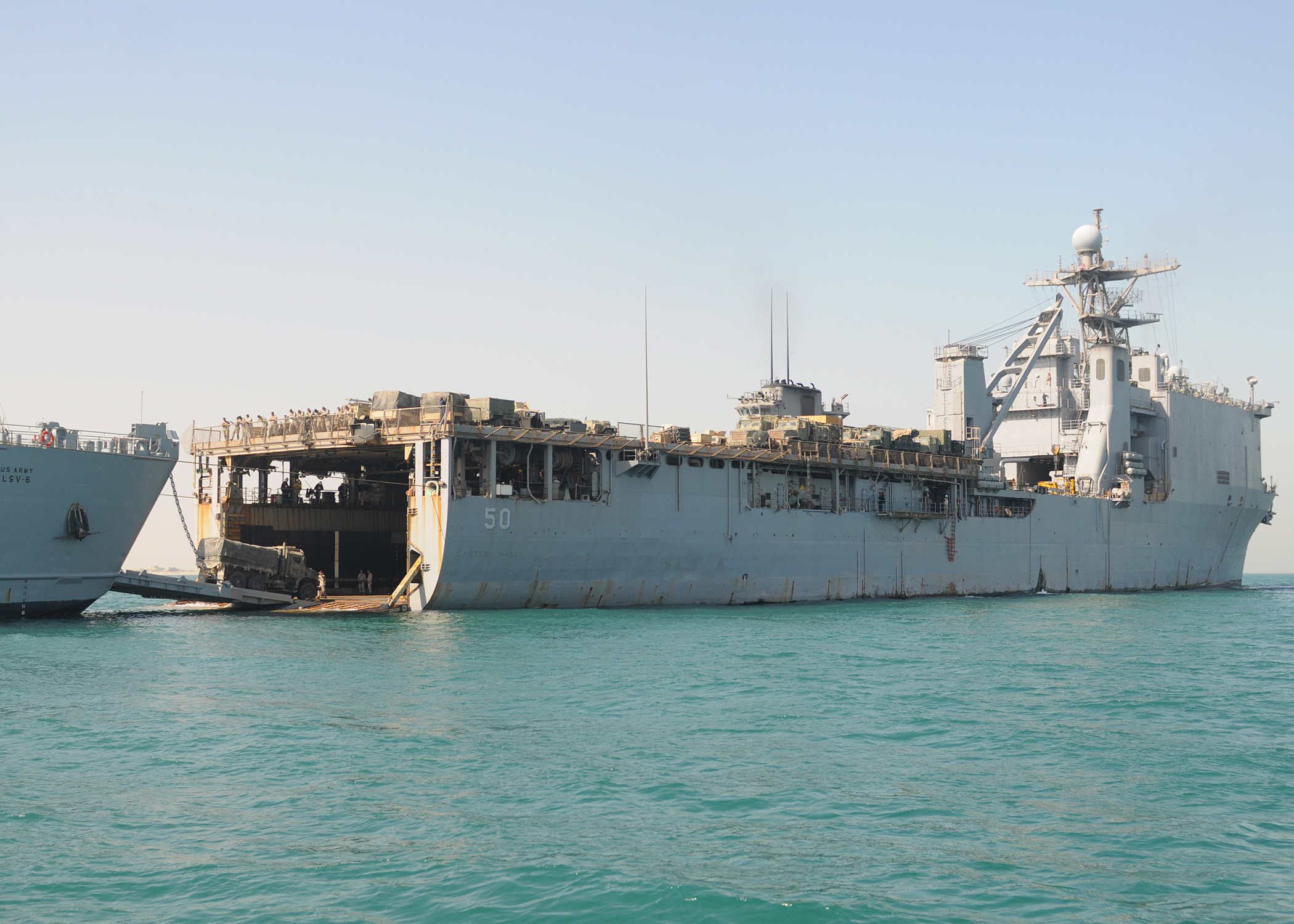

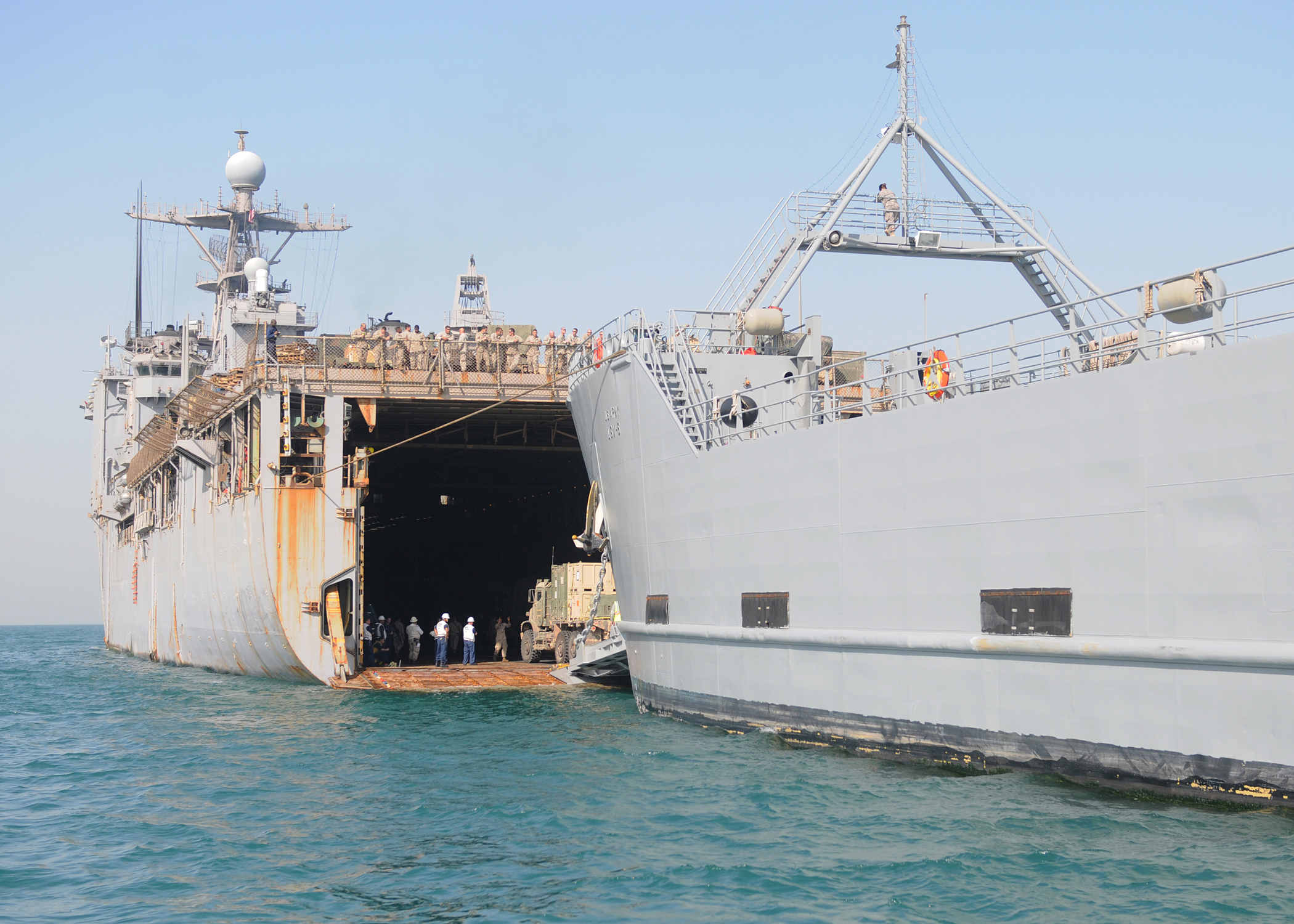
USAV SP4 James A. Loux on 23 December 2010
