= USAV SSGT Robert T. Kuroda =

SSGT Robert T Kuroda class support vessel of the US Army

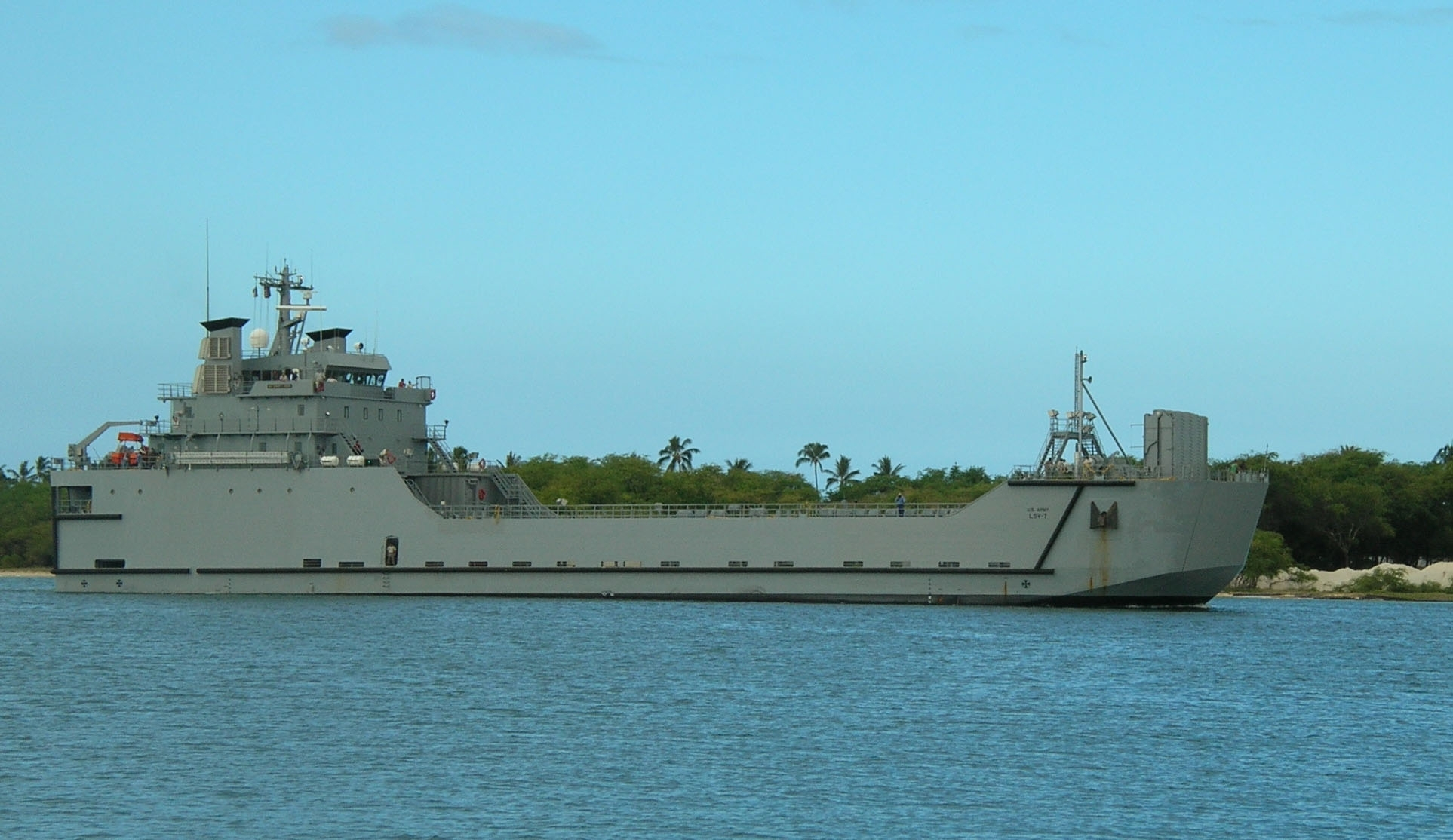
- USAV SSGT Robert T. Kuroda

History

United States
- Name: SSGT Robert T. Kuroda
- Namesake: Robert T. Kuroda
- Operator: United States Army
- Builder: VT Halter Marine, Pascagoula
- Acquired: 15 July 2005
- Commissioned: 2005
- Home port: Pearl Harbor
- Identification: MMSI number: 369873000; Callsign: ADSW; Pennant number: LSV-7
- Status: Active

General characteristics
- Class & type: Robert T Kuroda class support vessel class roll-on/roll-off
- Displacement: 6,000 short tons (5,443 t)
- Length: 315 ft (96 m)
- Beam: 60 ft (18 m)
- Draft: 12 ft (3.7 m)
- Propulsion: 2 × EMD 16-645E2; 1,950 hp (1,454 kW) each at 999 rpm
- Speed: 12.5 knots (23.2 km/h; 14.4 mph) light; 11.5 knots (21.3 km/h; 13.2 mph) loaded
- Range: 8,200 nmi (15,200 km) light; 6,500 nmi (12,000 km) loaded
- Complement: 8 officers, 23 enlisted

USAV SSGT Robert T. Kuroda (LSV-7) is a General Frank S. Besson Jr.–class roll-on/roll-off of US Army.

== Design ==
Named in honor of Gen. Frank S. Besson Jr., former Chief of Transportation, U.S. Army, these ships have bow and stern ramps and the ability to beach themselves, giving them the ability to discharge 900 short tons of vehicles and cargo over the shore in as little as four feet of water, or 2,000 short tons as an intra-theater line haul roll-on/roll-off cargo ship. The vessel's cargo deck is designed to handle any vehicle in the US Army inventory and can carry up to 15 M1 Abrams main battle tanks or 82 ISO standard containers.

== Construction and career ==
She was acquired by the US Army on 30 September 1994 and commissioned in 1994 into the 548th Transportation Detachment, United States Army Reserve.
