= USAV General Frank S. Besson Jr. =

General Frank S. Besson Jr. class support vessel of the US Army

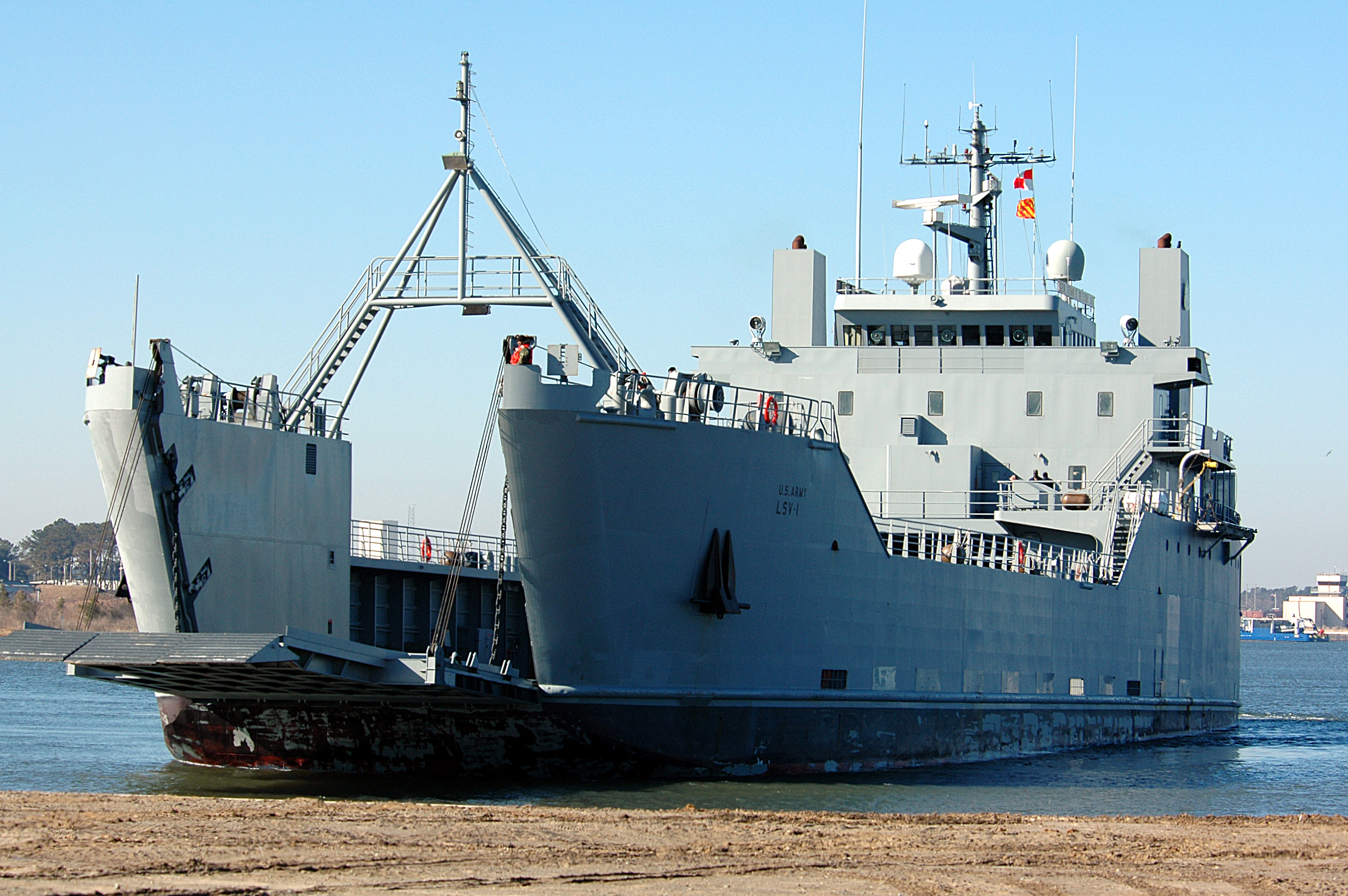
- USAV General Frank S. Besson Jr. on 5 February 2005

History

United States
- Name: General Frank S. Besson Jr.
- Namesake: Frank S. Besson Jr.
- Operator: United States Army
- Builder: VT Halter Marine, Pascagoula
- Acquired: 19 September 1987
- Commissioned: 1988
- Home port: Fort Eustis
- Identification: MMSI number: 368766000; Callsign: AAEC; Pennant number: LSV-1
- Status: Active

General characteristics
- Class & type: General Frank S. Besson class roll-on/roll-off
- Displacement: 4,199 long tons (4,266 t)
- Length: 273 ft (83 m)
- Beam: 60 ft (18 m)
- Draft: 12 ft (3.7 m)
- Propulsion: 2 × EMD 16-645E2; 1,950 hp (1,454 kW) each at 999 rpm
- Speed: 12.5 knots (23.2 km/h; 14.4 mph) light; 11.5 knots (21.3 km/h; 13.2 mph) loaded
- Range: 8,200 nmi (15,200 km) light; 6,500 nmi (12,000 km) loaded
- Complement: 8 officers, 23 enlisted

USAV General Frank S. Besson Jr. (LSV-1) is the lead ship of the General Frank S. Besson Jr.-class roll-on/roll-off of US Army.

== Design ==
Named in honor of Gen. Frank S. Besson Jr., former Chief of Transportation, U.S. Army, these ships have bow and stern ramps and the ability to beach themselves, giving them the ability to discharge 900 short tons of vehicles and cargo over the shore in as little as four feet of water, or 2,000 short tons as an intra-theater line haul roll-on/roll-off cargo ship. The vessel's cargo deck is designed to handle any vehicle in the US Army inventory and can carry up to 15 M1 Abrams main battle tanks or 82 ISO standard containers.

== Construction and career ==
She was acquired by the US Army on 19 September 1987 and commissioned in 1988 into the 335th Transportation Detachment, 7th Expeditionary Transportation Brigade. She is homeported in Fort Eustis.

In 1988 she was christened by Frances Rogers “Betty” Wheeler, Besson’s third wife.

She was deployed in 2024 to take part in the Gaza Maritime Corridor.

== Gallery ==
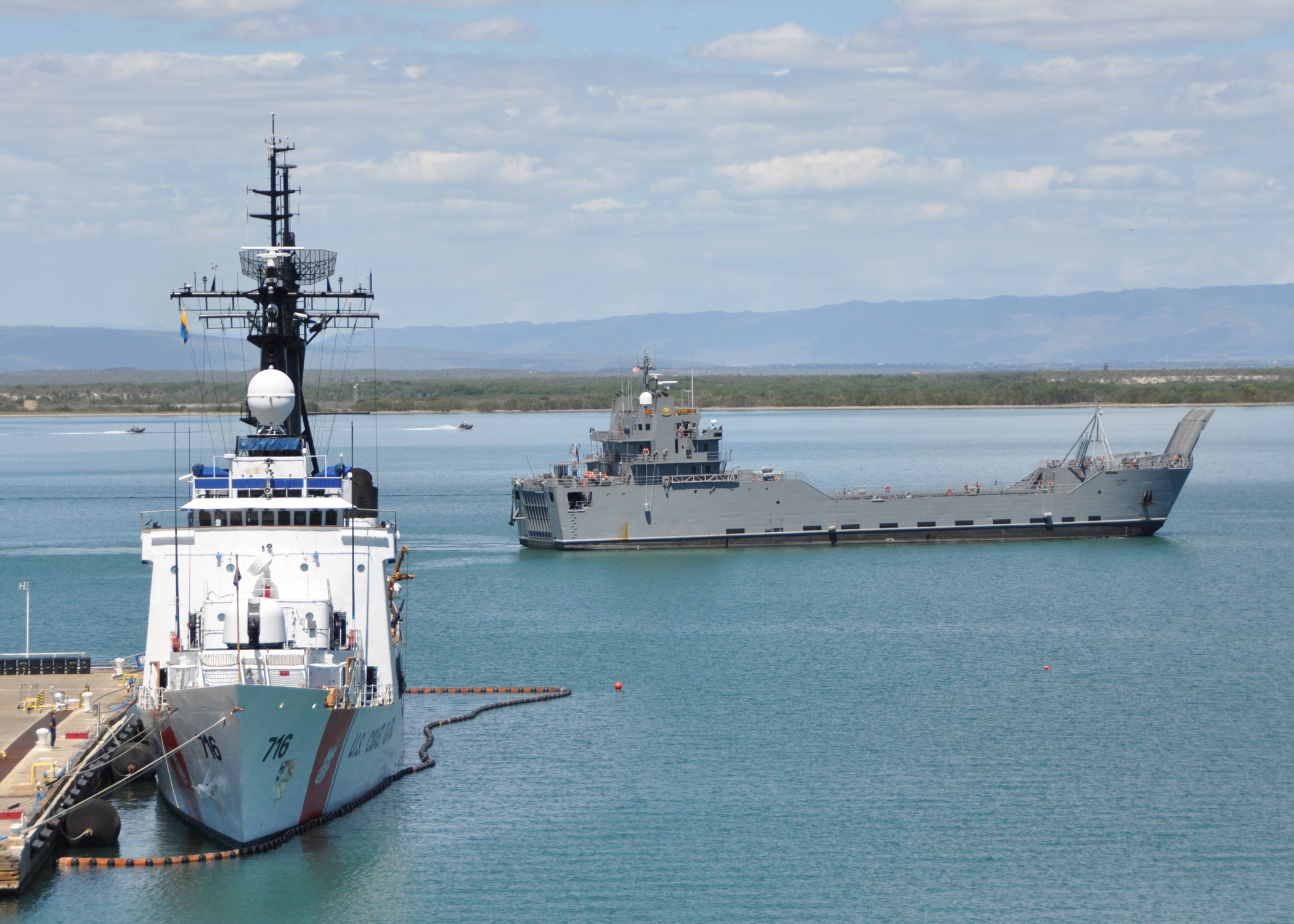
USAV General Frank S. Besson Jr. and USCGC Dallas in Guantanamo Bay on 8 March 2010

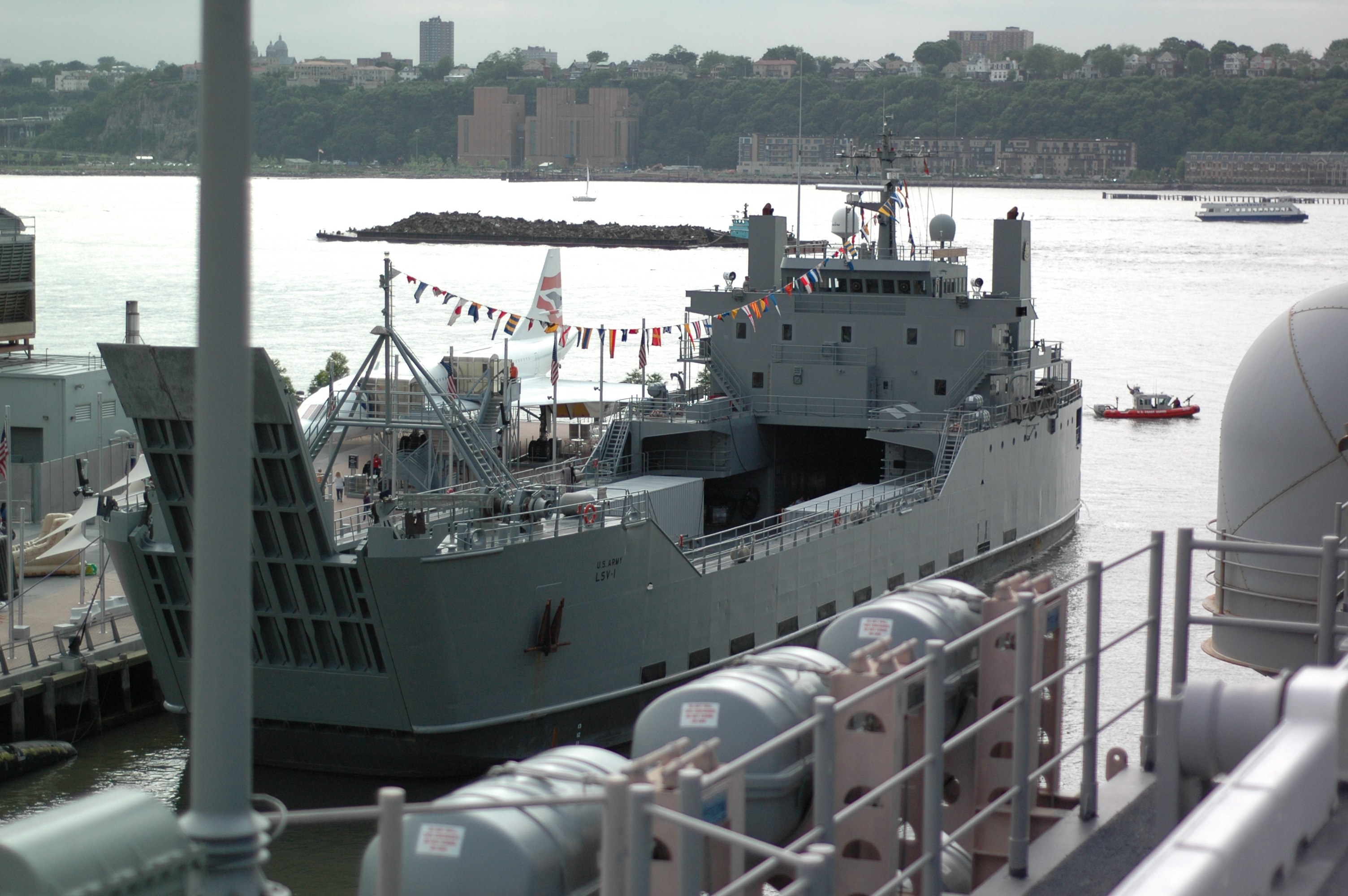
USAV General Frank S. Besson Jr. on 29 May 2010

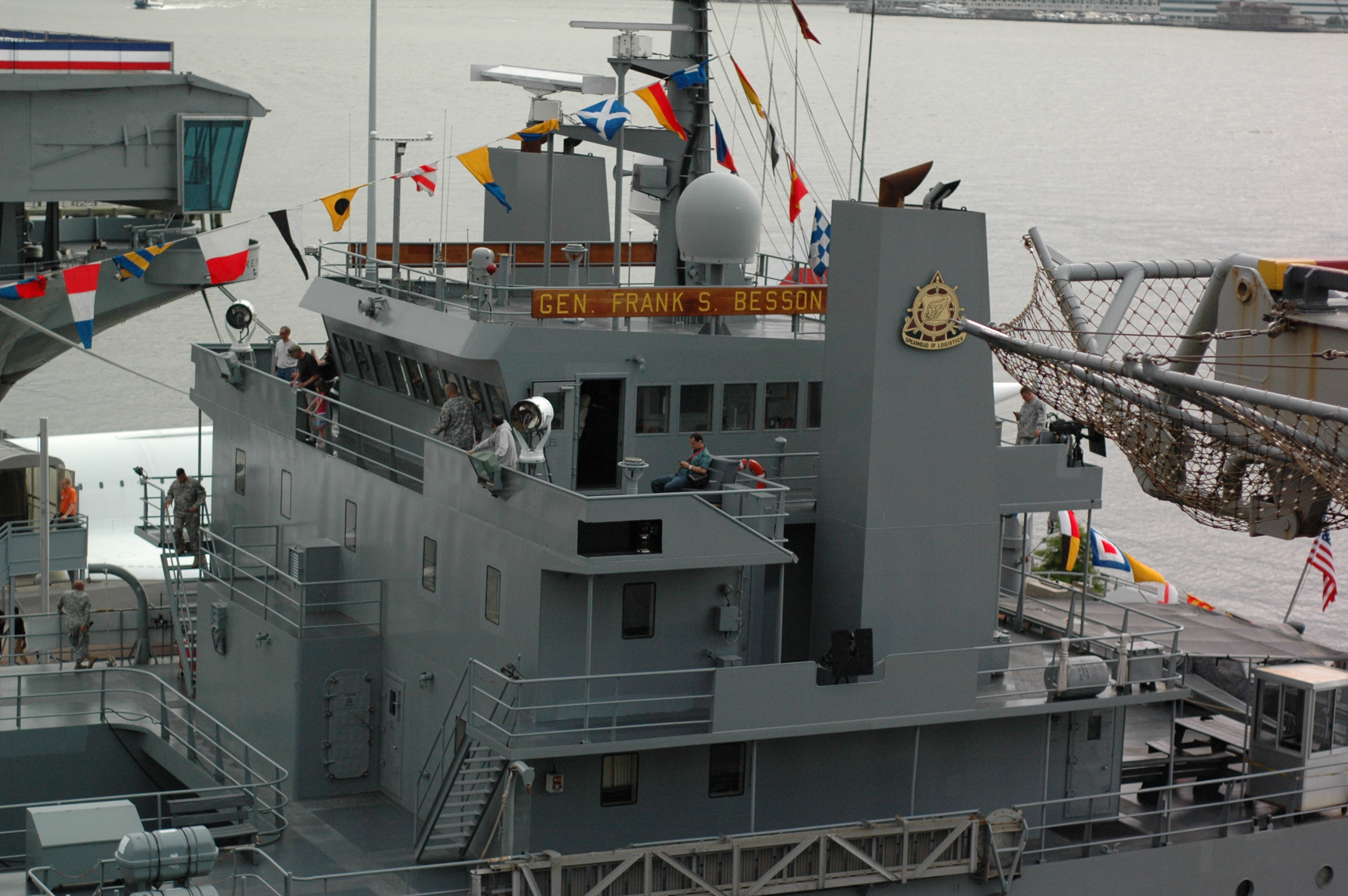

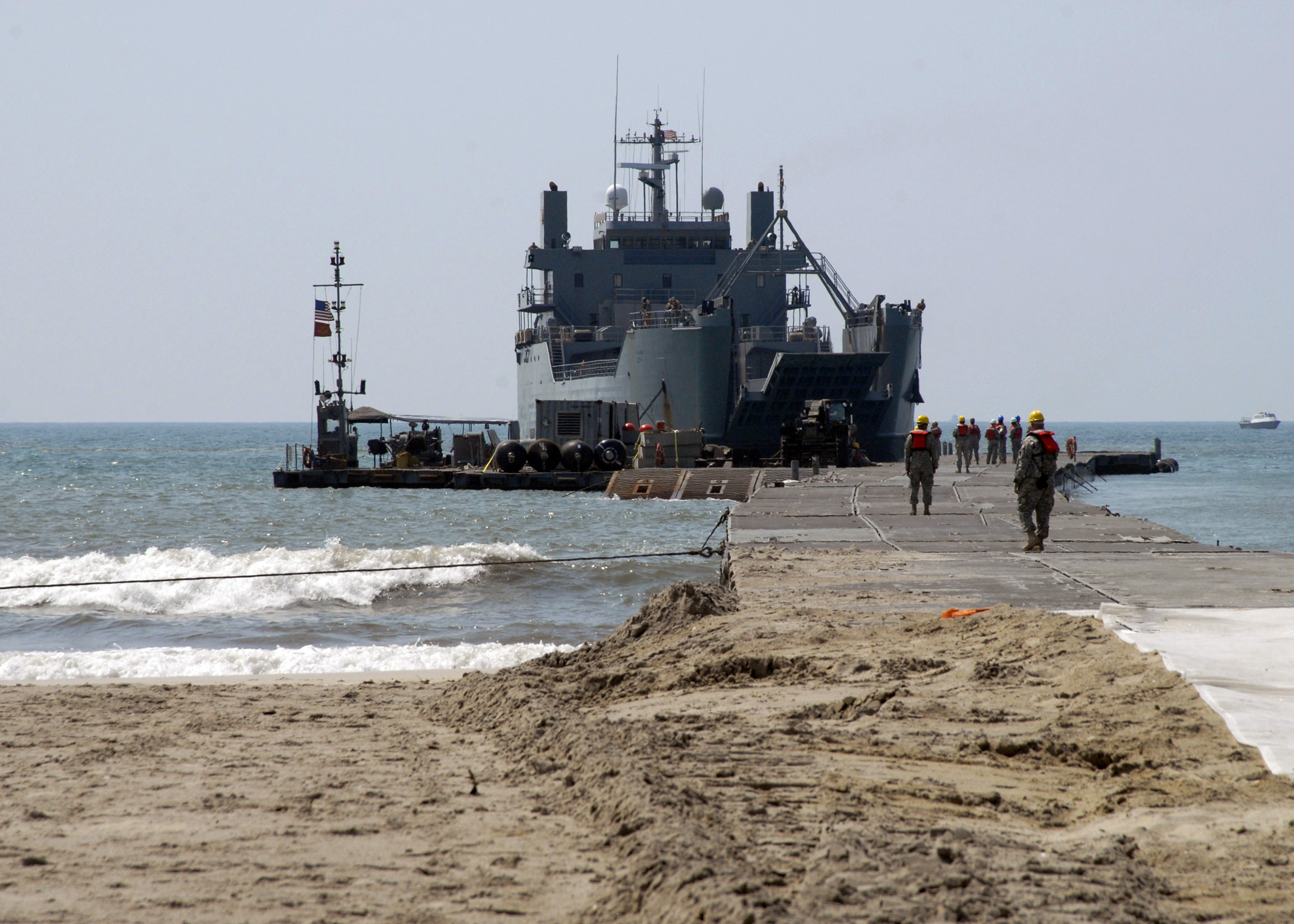
