= Robert T. Kuroda =

US Army Medal of Honor recipient (1922–1944)

Robert Toshio Kuroda
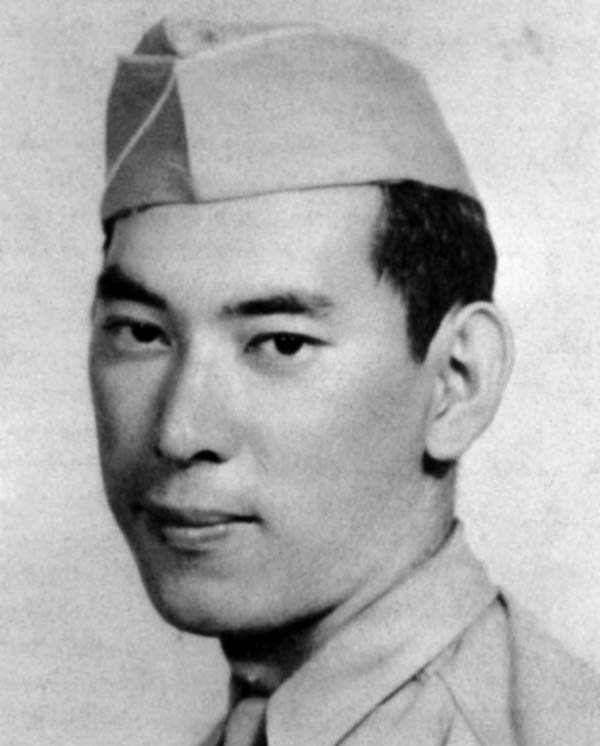
- Born: November 8, 1922; Aiea, Territory of Hawaii (now State of Hawaii)
- Died: October 20, 1944 (aged 21) near Bruyères, France
- Burial place: National Memorial Cemetery of the Pacific Honolulu, Hawaii
- Military career
- Allegiance: United States of America
- Branch: United States Army
- Service years: 1943–1944
- Rank: Staff Sergeant
- Unit: 442nd Regimental Combat Team
- Conflicts: World War II †
- Awards: Medal of Honor

Robert Toshio Kuroda (Japanese: 黒田 利男, November 8, 1922 – October 20, 1944) was a United States Army soldier. He was a recipient of the United States military's highest decoration—the Medal of Honor—for his actions in World War II.

== Early life ==
Robert Kuroda was born in Aiea, Hawaii, the son of immigrants from Japan. He was thus a Nisei, which means a second generation Japanese-American. Kuroda was trained as an electrician, but he enlisted in the U.S. Army in March 1943, at the age of 20.

== Military service ==
Kuroda joined the Army in March 1943.

Kuroda volunteered to join the all-Nisei 442nd Regimental Combat Team. This army unit was mostly made up of Japanese Americans from Hawaii and the mainland.

On October 20, 1944, Kuroda was serving as a staff sergeant in the 442nd Regimental Combat Team. On that day, near Bruyères, France, he single-handedly attacked two enemy machine gun emplacements before being killed by a sniper. For these actions, he was posthumously awarded the Army's second-highest decoration, the Distinguished Service Cross. A 1990s review of service records for Asian Americans who received the Distinguished Service Cross during World War II led to Kuroda's award being upgraded to the Medal of Honor. In a ceremony at the White House on June 21, 2000, his surviving family was presented with his Medal of Honor by President Bill Clinton. Twenty-one other Asian Americans also received the medal during the ceremony, all but seven of them posthumously.

Kuroda, aged 21 at his death, is buried at the National Memorial Cemetery of the Pacific in Honolulu, Hawaii.

In 2021, a French man walking in the forest with a metal detector near Bruyeres, France found Kuroda's high-school class ring. After searching for months, the man returned the ring to Kuroda's relatives in 2022.

== Medal of Honor citation ==
Staff Sergeant Kuroda's official Medal of Honor citation reads:

Staff Sergeant Robert T. Kuroda distinguished himself by extraordinary heroism in action, on 20 October 1944, near Bruyeres, France. Leading his men in an advance to destroy snipers and machine gun nests, Staff Sergeant Kuroda encountered heavy fire from enemy soldiers occupying a heavily wooded slope. Unable to pinpoint the hostile machine gun, he boldly made his way through heavy fire to the crest of the ridge. Once he located the machine gun, Staff Sergeant Kuroda advanced to a point within ten yards of the nest and killed three enemy gunners with grenades. He then fired clip after clip of rifle ammunition, killing or wounding at least three of the enemy. As he expended the last of his ammunition, he observed that an American officer had been struck by a burst of fire from a hostile machine gun located on an adjacent hill. Rushing to the officer's assistance, he found that the officer had been killed. Picking up the officer's submachine gun, Staff Sergeant Kuroda advanced through continuous fire toward a second machine gun emplacement and destroyed the position. As he turned to fire upon additional enemy soldiers, he was killed by a sniper. Staff Sergeant Kuroda's courageous actions and indomitable fighting spirit ensured the destruction of enemy resistance in the sector. Staff Sergeant Kuroda's extraordinary heroism and devotion to duty are in keeping with the highest traditions of military service and reflect great credit on him, his unit, and the United States Army.

== Awards and decorations ==

Badge	Combat Infantryman Badge		
1st row	Medal of Honor		
2nd row	Bronze Star Medal	Purple Heart	Army Good Conduct Medal
3rd row	American Campaign Medal	European–African–Middle Eastern Campaign Medal with one campaign star	World War II Victory Medal

== Other honors ==
The US Army's USAV SSGT Robert T. Kuroda (LSV-7) a roll-on/roll-off support ship is named in his honor.

== See also ==
- List of Asian Pacific American Medal of Honor recipients
- List of Medal of Honor recipients for World War II
