= Frank S. Besson Jr. =

United States Army general (1910–1985)

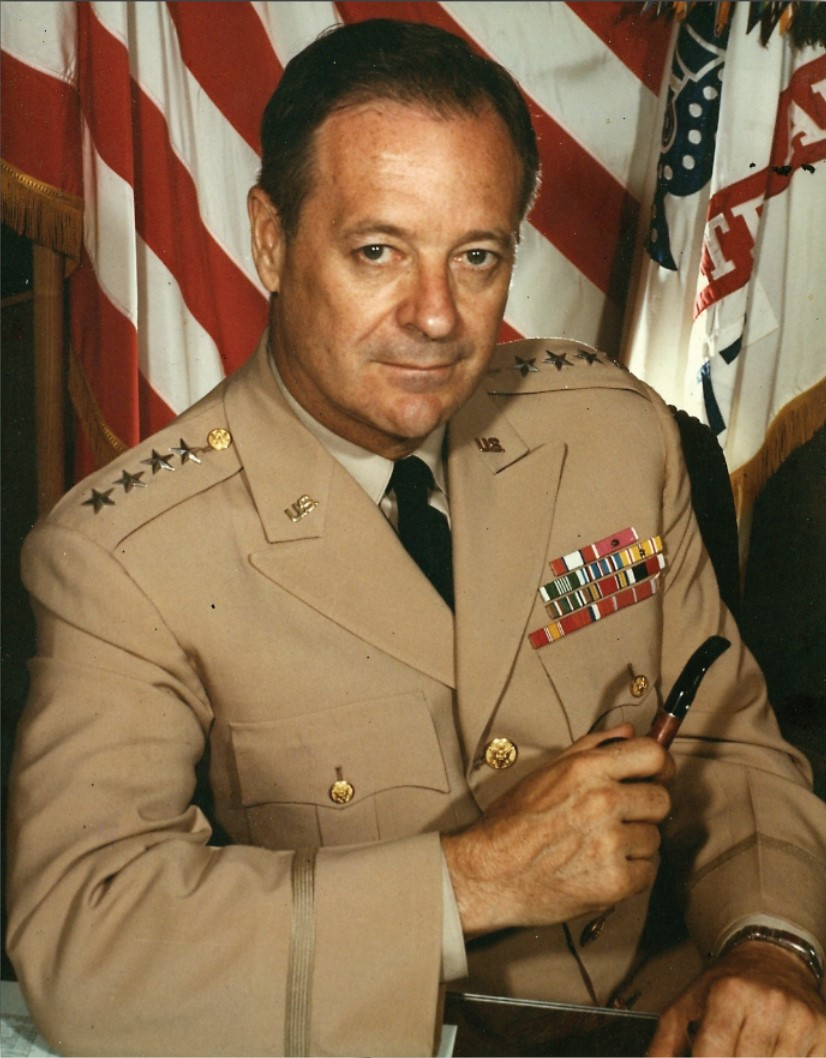
- General Frank S. Besson Jr.
- Born: 30 May 1910; Detroit, Michigan
- Died: 15 July 1985 (aged 75); Walter Reed Army Medical Center
- Spouses: Nancy Sessions Morris (m. 1935; died 1974) Beatrice Veronica (O'Boyle) George (m. 1975; died 1978) Frances Rogers "Betty" (Howell) Wheeler (m. 1980)
- Military career
- Allegiance: United States
- Branch: United States Army
- Service years: 1932–1970
- Rank: General
- Commands: United States Army Materiel Command; Transportation Corps; Military Railway Service
- Conflicts: World War II
- Awards: Army Distinguished Service Medal (3); Legion of Merit (2)
- Other work: Director, National Rail Passenger Corporation

Frank Schaffer Besson Jr., CBE (30 May 1910 – 15 July 1985) was a United States Army general who most notably served as the first commander of the US Army Materiel Command.

== Early life ==
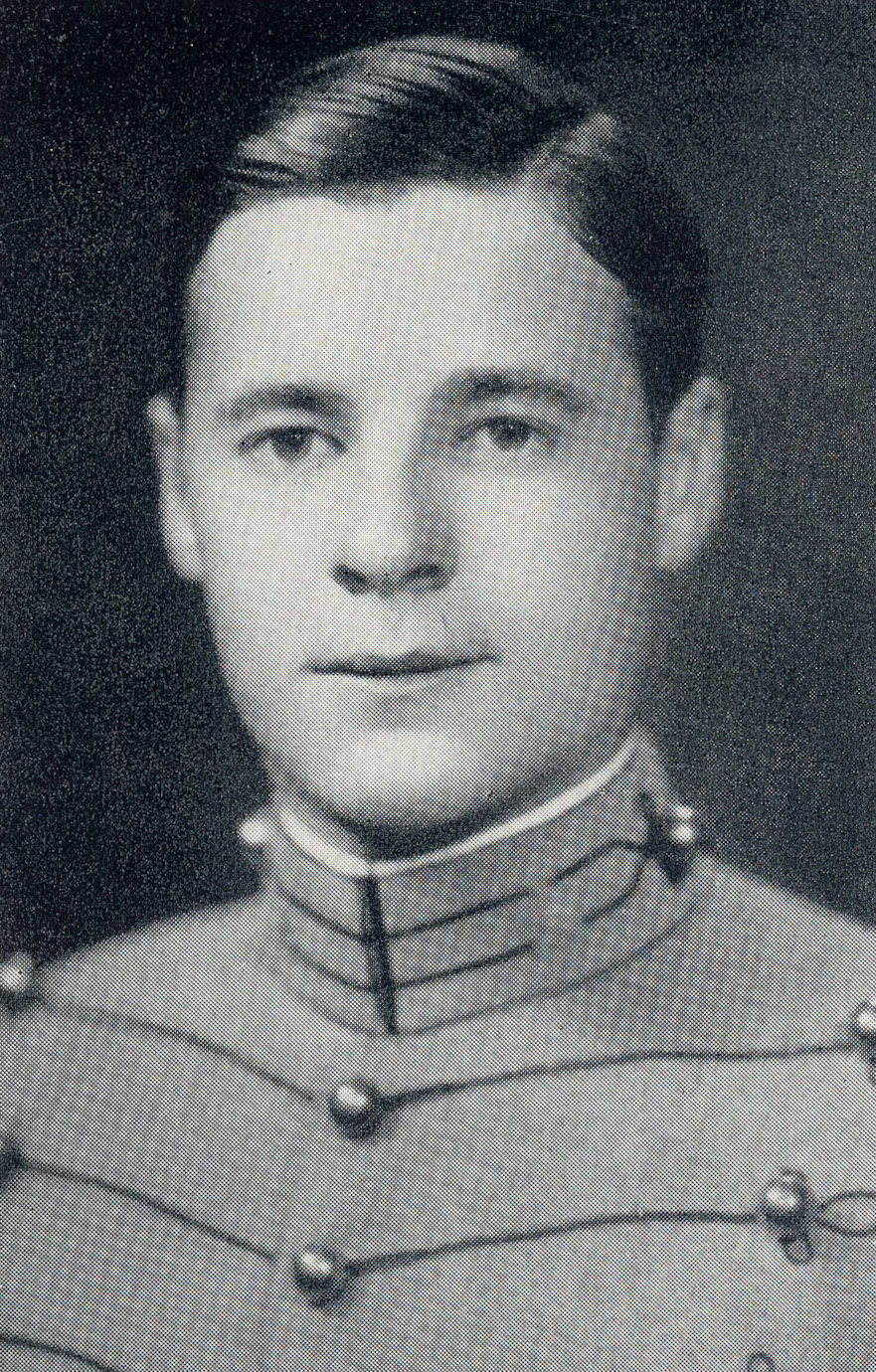
Besson as a West Point cadet in 1932

Besson born on 30 May 1910, in Detroit, Michigan. His father Frank Schaffer Besson Sr. was a West Point graduate and a colonel in the Corps of Engineers.

== Military career ==
Besson graduated seventh in his class from the United States Military Academy in 1932 and was commissioned in the Corps of Engineers. In 1935, he received an M.S. degree in civil engineering from the Massachusetts Institute of Technology. His research project was a collaboration with Rush B. Lincoln Jr. and two other West Point classmates under the supervision of Glennon Gilboy. His early career was noted for the role he played in the development of portable military pipelines, Perforated Steel Planking (PSP) (steel landing mats) for airplanes, and steel treadway bridges. He is credited with the studies leading to the army's adoption of the Bailey bridge, used extensively in all theaters in World War II.

Besson became assistant director of the Third Military Railway Service (with rank of lieutenant colonel) in 1943, and was promoted to Director (with rank of colonel) the following year. As Director of the Third Military Railway Service in Iran from 1944 to 1945, Besson ensured the flow of war materials to the Russian forces through the Persian Corridor. He was promoted to brigadier general, becoming, at just 34, the youngest general officer in the Army Ground Forces and Chief of the Railway Division. Toward the end of World War II, he was Deputy Chief Transportation Officer of the Army Forces in the Western Pacific and, when Japan's collapse was imminent, assumed full control of railroads in Japan. During the first year of occupation, Besson directed the rehabilitation of the Japanese rail system, moving more than 200,000 troops and 150,000 tons of supplies in the first two months.

Subsequent assignments included a tour as Assistant Chief of Staff, Supreme Headquarters Allied Powers Europe (SHAPE), where Besson formulated logistics plans and overall programs to meet the complex requirements of the fifteen nations of the NATO alliance. His efforts in instituting a system for "costing out" five-year programs, thereby bringing force goals into consonance with available resources, earned him the first Army Distinguished Service Medal to be awarded at SHAPE headquarters. He was formally transferred to the Army Transportation Corps on 28 July 1950.

Besson introduced the roll-on/roll-off technique for the rapid loading and discharge of wheeled and tracked vehicles. He further refined these concepts upon assuming command of the Transportation Center and School at Fort Eustis, Virginia, in 1953. Besson was the Chief of Transportation, United States Army from March 1958 until 2 April 1962, when he took charge of the United States Army Materiel Command.

Besson was the first Commander of the Army Materiel Command, formed in 1962 during a major army reorganization. During his command, the mammoth logistical organization, with an annual budget exceeding $14 billion and an inventory of $21 billion, employed more than 160,000 civilian personnel, in addition to its military complement of 14,000. In November 1962, Besson assigned Col. John F. Sullivan as project officer for Project Flat Top, a program that involved conversion of a former seaplane tender, the USS Albemarle (AV 5), into a floating helicopter repair shop for use off the coast of Vietnam.

In 1965, Besson permitted Malcom McLean of SeaLand to develop a plan to improve U.S. military logistics in Vietnam. McLean would go on to recommend containerization as a solution to logistical problems faced by the U.S. military. In 1966, Besson asked the Military Sea Transportation Service to contract SeaLand to operate regular container ship routes between Oakland, California, and Okinawa, Japan.

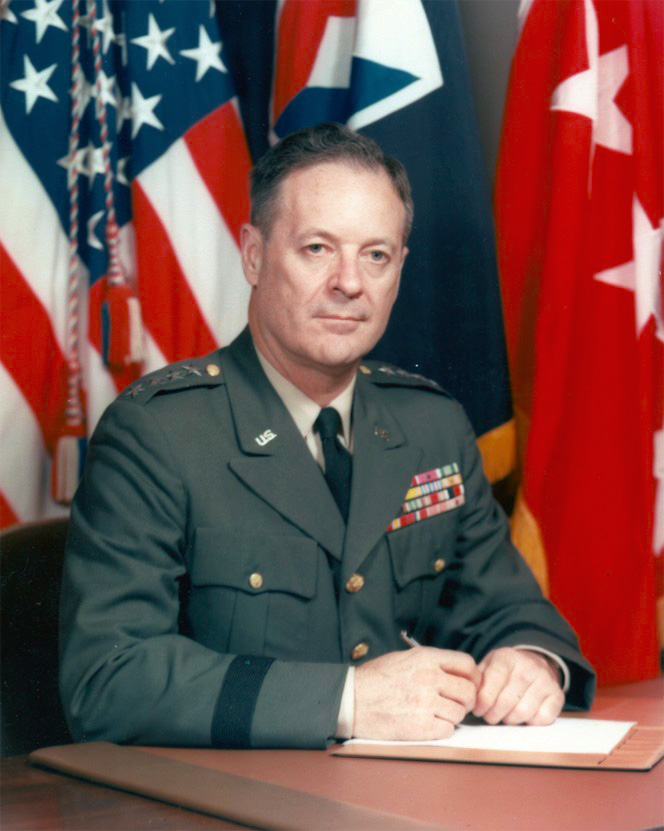
Besson in 1969.

As the first AMC Commander, Besson was charged with consolidating six army technical service organizations into a single command without disrupting effective materiel support for the army. His success resulted in his receiving the Merit Award of the Armed Forces Management Association in 1963. On 27 May 1964, Besson became a full general. He was the first army officer to achieve that rank as head of a logistical organization in peacetime.

In 1969, Besson was appointed by United States Deputy Secretary of Defense David Packard to be chairman of the Joint Logistics Review Board, formed to review logistic activities in support of the Vietnam War. Besson retired in September 1969 and the review board's report was released to the public on 6 November 1970. The report was highly critical of the Johnson administration for not calling up reserve forces until 1968, which created "personnel shortages, especially in logistic skills". It was believed to be the first time the military publicly criticized the Johnson administration. The report also pushed for the centralization of logistical operations, the widespread use of intermodal containers, and the phasing out of Conex boxes.

Besson's awards and decorations include the Army Distinguished Service Medal with two Oak Leaf Clusters, the Legion of Merit with one Oak Leaf Cluster, the Iranian Order of Homayoun, Honorary Commander of the Order of the British Empire, and the Republic of Korea's Order of Military Merit, Second Class (Ulchi).

== Amtrak ==
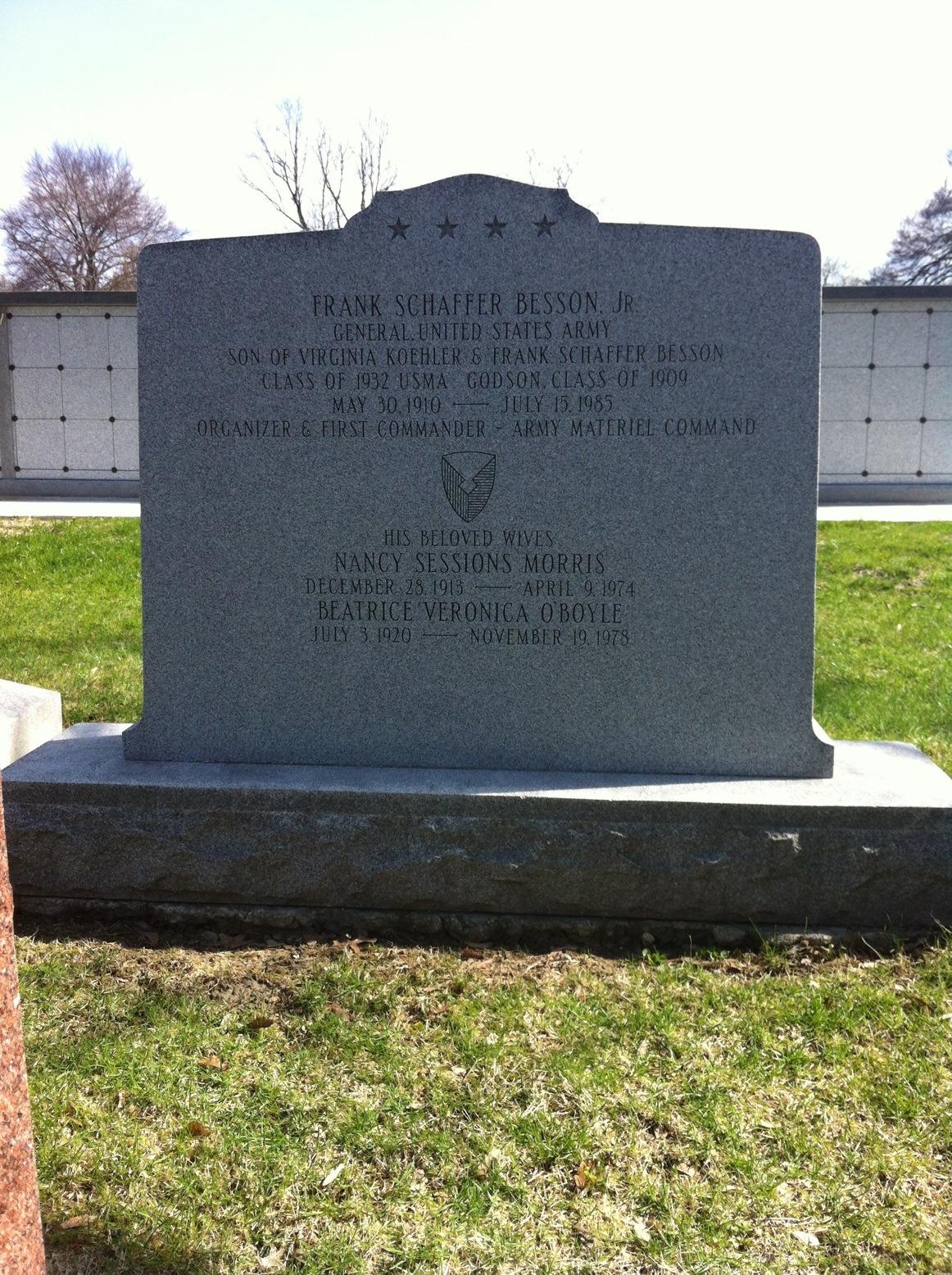
Grave of Besson and his first two wives in Section V of West Point Cemetery

While in retirement, Besson wrote about transportation and related problems in numerous professional journals. In 1971, he was nominated by Richard Nixon as one of the founding directors of the National Rail Passenger Corporation, which ran Amtrak. He was confirmed by the United States Senate on 3 May 1971, and remained on the board until 1977, when Jimmy Carter chose not to reappoint him.

== Personal life and death ==
Besson married Nancy Sessions Morris in 1935. They had three sons. After his wife's death in 1974, Besson married Beatrice Veronica (O'Boyle) George, who had four children from her first marriage. His second wife died of a cerebral hemorrhage in 1978. In 1980, Besson married Frances Rogers "Betty" (Howell) Wheeler, the widow of General Earle G. Wheeler.

On 15 July 1985, Besson died of cancer at Walter Reed Army Medical Center. He was buried beside his parents and his first two wives at the West Point Cemetery on 19 July 1985. Betty Wheeler resumed using her first husband's name and was buried with him at Arlington National Cemetery in 2004.

== Legacy ==
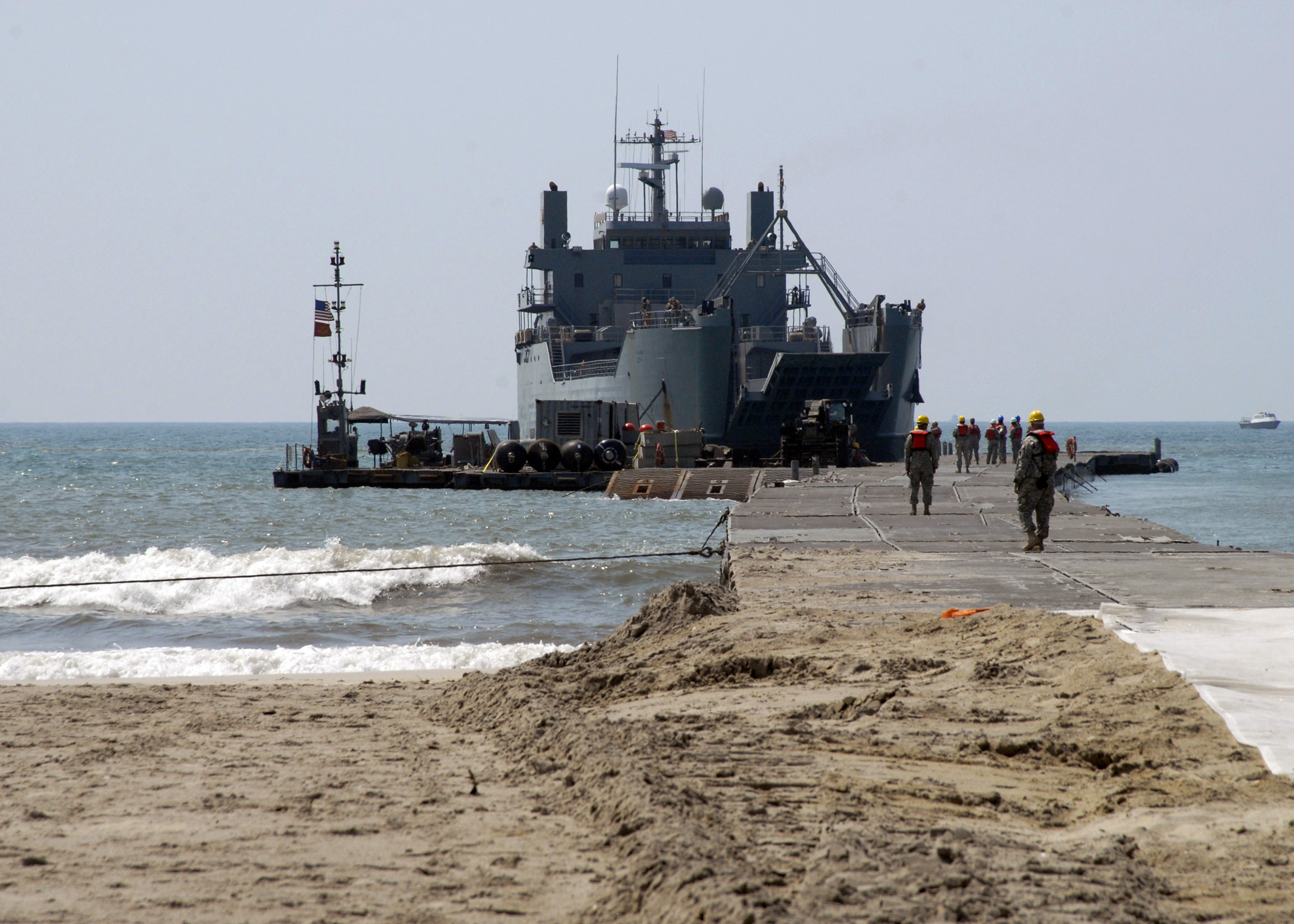
The USAV General Frank S. Besson Jr. unloading cargo during an exercise at Camp Lejuene

In 1985 the United States Army ordered the USAV General Frank S. Besson Jr. the lead ship of the General Frank S. Besson-class of Roll-on/roll-off support vessels. In 1988 the ship was christened by Frances Rogers Wheeler, Besson's third wife.

In 1986 Besson was inducted into the Army Aviation Hall of Fame.

== Medals and decorations ==
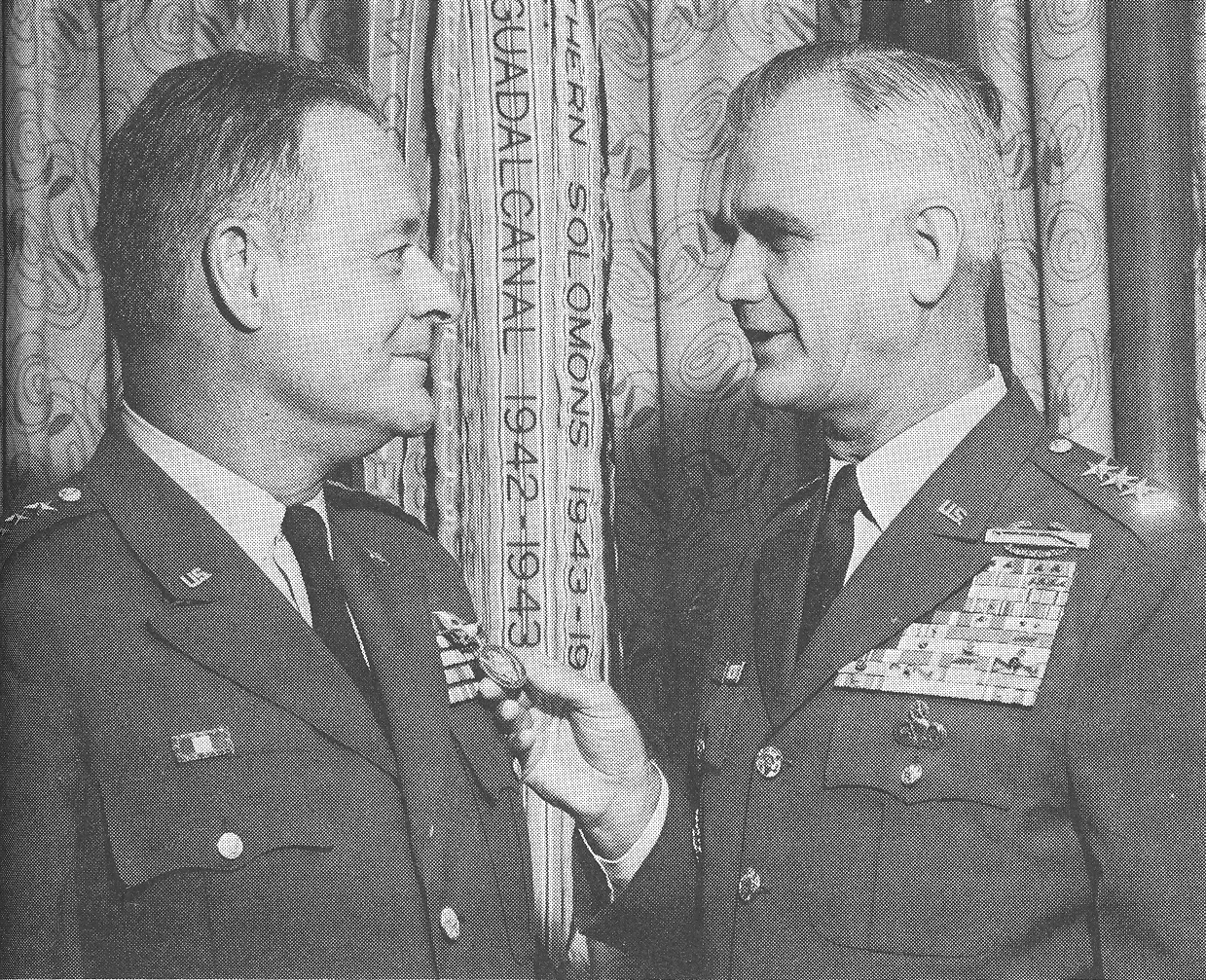
As commander of Army Materiel Command, Besson receiving the Distinguished Service Medal from General William C. Westmoreland, 1968

1st Row Awards	Army Distinguished Service Medal with three Oak Leaf Clusters	Legion of Merit with two Oak Leaf Clusters	Army Commendation Medal
2nd Row Awards	European–African–Middle Eastern Campaign Medal	Asiatic–Pacific Campaign Medal with 1 Service Stars	World War II Victory Medal
3rd Row Awards	Army of Occupation Medal	National Defense Service Medal	Philippine Liberation Medal
4th Row Awards	Order of the British Empire	South Korean Order of Military Merit, Second Class	Iranian Order of Homayoun
5th Row Awards	Philippine Republic Presidential Unit Citation		

== See also ==
- General Frank S. Besson, Jr. class Logistics Support Vessel
