= U.S. Route 183 in Texas =

Highway in Texas

U.S. Highway 183
- US 183 highlighted in red

Route information
- Maintained by TxDOT
- Length: 428.382 mi (Note: Length does not account for concurrencies along U.S. Highways with lower numbers) (689.414 km)
- Existed: 1939–present

Major junctions
- South end: Future I-69E / US 77 / US 77 Alt. in Refugio
- Future I-69W / US 59 in Goliad; US 87 in Cuero; I-10 / US 90 in Luling; I-35 / US 290 in Austin; US 190 / US 281 in Lampasas; US 67 / US 84 / US 377 in Early; I-20 near Cisco; US 180 in Breckenridge; US 82 / US 277 / US 283 in Seymour; US 70 / US 287 in Vernon
- North end: US 70 / US 183 at the Oklahoma state line near Oklaunion

Location
- Country: United States
- State: Texas
- Counties: Refugio, Goliad, DeWitt, Gonzales, Caldwell, Travis, Williamson, Burnet, Lampasas, Mills, Brown, Eastland, Stephens, Throckmorton, Baylor, Wilbarger

Highway system
- United States Numbered Highway System; List; Special; Divided; Highways in Texas; Interstate; US; State; Former; Toll; Loops; Spurs; FM/RM; Park; Rec
← SH 182	→ SH 183

U.S. Route 183 (US 183) is a north-south U.S. highway that begins in Texas in Refugio at an intersection with US 77 (Future I-69E) concurrent with US 77 Alt. The highway runs through many small communities with Austin being the only major city along its route. The highway exits Texas concurrent with US 70, crossing into Oklahoma.

== Route description ==
US 183 begins concurrent with US 77 Alt at its southern terminus one block north of downtown Refugio at an intersection with US 77; the two highways subsequently travel north through mostly rural farmlands across the Gulf Coastal Plains. After serving the Presidio La Bahía, US 183 crosses the San Antonio River to serve the Goliad State Park and Historic Site and the city of Goliad, intersecting US 59 in the center of town. Traveling through additional farmlands and forests, US 183 eventually forms a concurrency with US 87 just before crossing the Guadalupe River and travels along Espalande Street through downtown Cuero, ending its concurrency of US 87 in the town center. North of Cuero, US 77 Alt splits off to the northeast, while US 183 continues parallel to the Guadalupe River's course. The highway cuts through the historic Battle of Gonzales site and borders the city of Gonzales to the west, intersecting US 90 Alt to the northwest of the city. Running parallel to the San Marcos River, US 183 provides access to Palmetto State Park before crossing I-10 and forming a concurrency with US 90 west to Luling via Pierce Street. In the center of Luling, US 183 leaves US 90 and turns onto Magnolia Avenue, traveling due north past many decorated oil wells.

Continuing through rural farmlands, US 183 eventually enters Lockhart, being the main north-south route through the city. The highway then merges onto the SH 130 frontage roads just north of Lockhart, following them until Mustang Ridge where SH 130 splits northeast to follow SH 45 and US 183 continues north into Colton and Pilot Knob. As US 183 crosses into Austin and intersects several local roads providing access to McKinney Falls State Park, it borders the west side of Austin-Bergstrom International Airport before having an interchange with SH 71 and becomes a toll road also known as the Bergstrom Expressway enters Austin's Montopolis district. US 183 crosses the Colorado River adjacent to the old Montopolis truss bridge prior to serving a major fork east of the Govalle district, making a sigmoid curve east to serve the Colony Park district. US 183 eventually becomes a non tolled six-lane freeway north of the Windsor Park district just before crossing US 290, curving west to serve I-35 and Loop 275 (Lamar Boulevard); north of Lamar Boulevard, the US 183 frontage road is redesignated as Research Boulevard throughout the rest of its length in Austin. The highway makes another sigmoid curve to the north before an interchange with Loop 1 (Mopac Expressway).

After an interchange with Loop 360 (Capital of Texas Highway), US 183 serves much of northwest Austin. It eventually intersects SH 45 near Lakeline Mall and becomes a surface street while the freeway continues on the east side as 183A Toll Road. US 183 continues as Bell Boulevard through west Cedar Park before intersecting 183A in Leander. Continuing north, US 183 runs mostly through forests and farmland as it crosses the North and South Forks of the San Gabriel River. After turning through several hills east of the Texas Hill Country, US 183 bounds northwest into Lampasas, where it runs on Key Avenue concurrent with US 190 and US 281 through fourteen blocks in the city's downtown and recreational areas before splitting to the northwest from US 281 north of Lampasas.

US 183 and US 190 continue traveling northwest through rolling hills, eventually splitting southeast of the Lometa city limits. US 183 continues to run parallel to the Colorado River before beginning a concurrency with US 84 north of the Goldthwaite city limits. The two highways continue northwest for a long distance before reaching Early and joining US 67 and US 377 at the town's center. The four highways travel west for roughly eleven blocks before US 183 splits to the north and serves Brownwood Regional Airport. US 183 continues due north, crossing SH 36 in Rising Star and later I-20 just south of Cisco.

South of Throckmorton, US 283 joins the highway, an overlap that lasts until Vernon, where 183 joins US 70 and US 287. In Oklaunion, US 70 and 183 leave US 287 and cross the Red River together into Oklahoma.

== History ==
=== Austin ===
183 Toll Road
- Bergstrom Expressway
- Location: Austin
- Existed: 2019–present

Through 1990, none of US 183 through Austin was built to freeway standards. By 2002, the portion of US 183, known as Research Boulevard, had been upgraded to a freeway. At that time, Research Boulevard, between Spicewood Springs Road and Cameron Road, was built as a viaduct with grade-separated limited access. The northern freeway portion between Spicewood Springs Road and Bell Boulevard in Cedar Park was completed by 2003.

The southern freeway portion between Cameron Road and US 290 became completed in 2002.

In Cedar Park, the limited access portion of Research Boulevard would become the 183A Toll Road, as US 183 would serve as a major arterial through the city as Bell Boulevard. The toll road opened in March 2007. The roads rejoin north of Leander.

In 2015, it was announced work would start on the conversion of the then-55-year-old portion of US 183 from US 290 to SH 71 into a three-to-five-lane tollway. The traffic lights at 51st Street, Techni Center Drive, Bolm Road (formerly a diamond interchange), Vargas Road, and Thompson Lane were all removed. In addition to these changes, an interchange at Patton Avenue was constructed, the pedestrian crossing bridge just south of Manor Road was upgraded, and Montopolis Bridge was decommissioned in favor of a new truss bridge that serves as a pedestrian walkway, no longer open to motorized traffic. Construction began in early 2016 with expected completion in late 2019 or early 2020. The first section of the tollway opened on July 31, 2019, at which point the rest of the project was to be completed by late 2020.

Throughout 2018 to 2021, construction commenced to add three additional flyovers at the intersection of US 183 and I-35. When construction on the southbound I-35 to northbound US 183 flyover was completed, the preexisting northbound I-35 to northbound US 183 flyover was demolished on May 8, 2021, in favor of a replacement flyover completed on September 10, 2021, due to concerns over the latter flyover's incline being too steep for larger vehicles to navigate without delaying other traffic.

== Major intersections ==
All exits are unnumbered.

County	Location	mi	km	Destinations	Notes
Refugio	Refugio	0.0	0.0	US 77 Alt. ends / Future I-69E / US 77 – Corpus Christi, Victoria	Southern terminus; south end of US 77 Alt. overlap; U.S. 77 is the future Interstate 69E
Refugio		1.7	2.7	SH 202 west – Beeville	
Goliad		23.4	37.7	SH 239 east / FM 2441 south – Sarco, Tivoli	South end of SH 239 overlap
Goliad		24.2	38.9	Loop 71 east – Grave of Colonel Fannin and His Troops	
Goliad		24.4	39.3	Loop 71 – Presidio La Bahia, General Zaragoza Birth Place	
Goliad		24.9	40.1	PR 6 – Goliad State Park, Mission Espiritu Santo	
Goliad	Goliad	25.8	41.5	US 59 (Future I-69W) / SH 239 west – Beeville, Kenedy, Victoria	North end of SH 239 overlap; U.S. 59 is the future Interstate 69W
Goliad		30.1	48.4	FM 622 east – Schroeder	
Goliad		34.8	56.0	SH 119 north – Weesatche, Yorktown	
Goliad	Weser	39.6	63.7	FM 1961 – Weesatche, Ander	
DeWitt		43.6	70.2	FM 237 – Yorktown, Meyersville	
DeWitt		53.2	85.6	FM 2718 south	
DeWitt		53.7	86.4	US 87 north – San Antonio	South end of US 87 overlap
DeWitt	Cuero	56.3	90.6	SH 72 west (West Heaton Street)	
DeWitt	Cuero	56.6	91.1	FM 236 south (Morgan Avenue) – Arneckeville	
DeWitt	Cuero	57.0	91.7	US 87 south (Broadway Street) – Victoria	North end of US 87 overlap
DeWitt	Cuero	57.4	92.4	FM 766 north (Reuss Boulevard) – Cheapside, Stevenson Unit	
DeWitt	Cuero	57.5	92.5	FM 1447 east (East Bailey Street)	
DeWitt		60.9	98.0	US 77 Alt. north – Yoakum	North end of US 77 Alt. overlap
DeWitt	Concrete	67.8	109.1	FM 951 north	
DeWitt	Hochheim	72.5	116.7	SH 111 east – Yoakum	
Gonzales		77.4	124.6	FM 2067 south – Cheapside	
Gonzales		86.2	138.7	FM 3282 south	
Gonzales		87.4	140.7	SH 97 west – Cost	South end of SH 97 overlap
Gonzales	Gonzales	88.9	143.1	Bus. US 183 north – Gonzales	
Gonzales	Gonzales	89.4	143.9	Spur 146 east (St. Louis Street)	
Gonzales	Gonzales	90.5	145.6	US 90 Alt. / SH 97 east – Seguin, Shiner	North end of SH 97 overlap; access to Gonzales Memorial Hospital
Gonzales	Gonzales	91.4	147.1	Bus. US 183 south – Gonzales, Airport	
Gonzales		99.0	159.3	FM 1586 west – Ottine	
Gonzales		100.9	162.4	PR 11 south – Palmetto State Park	
Caldwell	Luling	103.3	166.2	I-10 – San Antonio, Houston	I-10 exit 632
Caldwell	Luling	103.6	166.7	US 90 east	South end of US 90 overlap
Caldwell	Luling	107.2	172.5	US 90 west / SH 80 south to I-10 – Seguin, San Antonio	North end of US 90 overlap; south end of SH 80 overlap
Caldwell	Luling	107.3	172.7	FM 1322 north (Davis Street)	
Caldwell	Luling	107.4	172.8	SH 80 north – San Marcos	North end of SH 80 overlap
Caldwell	Luling	108.2	174.1	FM 86 north / FM 2984 north – Bastrop	
Caldwell		116.5	187.5	FM 671 south – Stairtown	
Caldwell	Lockhart	120.7	194.2	FM 20 east – Bastrop	South end of FM 20 overlap
Caldwell	Lockhart	120.8	194.4	FM 20 west – Fentress	North end of FM 20 overlap
Caldwell	Lockhart	121.7	195.9	SH 142 west to SH 130 Toll – San Marcos	
Caldwell	Lockhart	122.2	196.7	FM 672 east	
Caldwell	Lockhart	122.8	197.6	FM 2001 west to SH 130 Toll – Niederwald, Seguin, San Antonio	
Caldwell	Lockhart	123.8	199.2	SH 130 Toll south – Seguin, San Antonio	South end of SH 130 overlap; SH 130 exit 470; US 183 follows SH 130 Toll frontage roads
Caldwell		126.6	203.7	FM 1185 north	SH 130 exit 469
Caldwell	Mendoza	130.3	209.7	Briarpatch Road / Homannville Trail	SH 130 exit 465
Caldwell	Mustang Ridge	131.7	212.0	SH 21 – San Marcos, Bastrop	SH 130 exit 463
Travis	Mustang Ridge	133.1	214.2	Old Lockhart Road	SH 130 exit 460
Travis	Mustang Ridge	135.6	218.2	SH 45 Toll / SH 130 Toll north to I-35 – Buda, Austin, Waco	North end of SH 130 overlap; SH 130 exits 457 and 460
Travis	Mustang Ridge	136.5	219.7	FM 1327 west – Creedmoor	
Travis		138.0	222.1	FM 973 north	
Travis	Pilot Knob	140.0	225.3	FM 1625 south / McKenzie Road	
Travis	Pilot Knob	141.4	227.6	FM 812 east / D.G. Collins Road – Circuit of the Americas, McKinney Falls State Park	
Travis	Austin	145.3	233.8	SH 71 (Ben White Boulevard) – Bastrop, Airport	Interchange
Travis	Austin	146.1	235.1	183 Toll Road begins / Patton Avenue – Lampasas	Non-tolled southbound exit and northbound entrance; US 183 splits from the toll road via the ramps
Travis	Austin	147.0	236.6	183 Toll Road / Montopolis Drive	Access point
Travis	Austin			Anderson Expressway Bridge over the Colorado River	
Travis	Austin	147.3	237.1	183 Toll Road / Loop 111 (Airport Boulevard) / Cesar Chavez Street / 5th Street / 7th Street	Non-tolled interchange and access point
Travis	Austin			Bolm Road	Closed permanently during construction of Bergstrom Expressway on October 5, 2018; U-turns remained open until late December 2019
Travis	Austin	149.2	240.1	183 Toll Road / Boggy Creek turnaround	Access point; incomplete access to Bolm Road and Techni Center Drive is signed in both directions
Travis	Austin	150.6	242.4	183 Toll Road / FM 969 (MLK Boulevard)	Non-tolled interchange and access point; no direct southbound entrance to the toll road
Travis	Austin	151.8	244.3	183 Toll Road ends / Loyola Lane	Access point; northbound exit from toll road is via FM 969
Travis	Austin	152.5	245.4	Manor Road / Springdale Road	North end of tollway; south end of freeway; no direct southbound entrance to the toll road
Travis	Austin	152.8– 153.1	245.9– 246.4	US 290 / 290 Toll Road east – Houston	No direct exits to US 290 west (signed northbound at Manor Road and southbound at Cameron Road)
Travis	Austin	153.9	247.7	Cameron Road	
Travis	Austin	154.7	249.0	I-35 – San Antonio, Waco	I-35 exits 240A-B
Travis	Austin	156.5	251.9	Loop 275 (Lamar Boulevard)	No direct northbound exit or southbound entrance (signed at I-35)
Travis	Austin	156.6	252.0	Ohlen Road / Payton Gin Road	
Travis	Austin	158.0	254.3	FM 1325 (Burnet Road) – Q2 Stadium	
Travis	Austin	158.8	255.6	Loop 1 (Mopac Boulevard)	
Travis	Austin			Loop 1 Express south	Southbound toll exit only; south end of toll express lanes;
Travis	Austin	159.5	256.7	Loop 360 (Capital of Texas Highway)	
Travis	Austin			Great Hills Trail	Direct southbound entrance only (northbound exit signed at Capital of Texas Highway; southbound exit signed at Braker Lane)
Travis	Austin	160.6	258.5	Braker Lane	Access to Ascension Seton Northwest Hospital
Travis	Austin			Balcones Woods Drive	No direct exits or entrances (northbound exit signed at Braker Lane; southbound exit signed at Duval Road)
Travis	Austin	161.8	260.4	Duval Road	
Travis	Austin	162.5	261.5	Oak Knoll Drive	
Williamson	Austin	163.5	263.1	McNeil Drive / Spicewood Springs Road	Full access to Pond Springs Road
Williamson	Austin	164.4	264.6	Anderson Mill Road	No direct southbound exit (signed at Lake Creek Parkway)
Williamson	Austin	166.0	267.2	Lake Creek Parkway / Pecan Park Boulevard	
Williamson	Austin	166.5	268.0	SH 45 Toll east / RM 620	No direct northbound exit to RM 620 (signed at Lake Creek Parkway)
Williamson	Austin	167.2	269.1	183A Toll Road north / Lakeline Mall Drive	North end of freeway; south end of 183A Toll Road; interchange with Lakeline Mall Drive southbound; at-grade intersection northbound
Williamson	Austin	168.0	270.4	183A Toll Road north / Lakeline Boulevard	Lakeline station
Williamson	Austin–Cedar Park line	165.5	266.3	183A Toll Road / Avery Ranch Boulevard	
Williamson	Cedar Park	171.4	275.8	RM 1431 (Whitestone Boulevard) to 183A Toll Road	
Williamson	Leander	175.7	282.8	RM 2243 east to 183A Toll Road / South Street – Georgetown	
Williamson	Leander	175.8	282.9	West Broade Street	former RM 2243 west
Williamson	Leander	177.7	286.0	183A Toll Road south / Bryson Ridge Trail	Becomes frontage road both ways for 183A north of the intersection
Williamson	Liberty Hill	181.2	291.6	SH 29 / 183A Toll Road ends / – Burnet, Georgetown	Current north end of 183A Toll and frontage road
Williamson		183.7	295.6	RM 1869 west – Liberty Hill	
Williamson		185.0	297.7	FM 3405 east	
Williamson		189.7	305.3	FM 970 east – Florence	
Williamson		194.2	312.5	SH 138 east – Florence	
Williamson		194.3	312.7	RM 243 west – Bertram	
Burnet	Briggs	197.7	318.2	Loop 308 to FM 2657	
Burnet	Briggs	198.3	319.1	Loop 308 to FM 2657 – Briggs, Oakalla	
Burnet		204.6	329.3	RM 963 – Burnet	
Lampasas	Lampasas	217.8	350.5	US 190 east (Central Texas Highway) / US 281 south (E. E. Ohnmeiss Jr. Drive) – Burnet, San Antonio, Fort Hood, Killeen, Belton	South end of US 190 / US 281 overlap
Lampasas	Lampasas	218.1	351.0	Bus. US 281 south	
Lampasas	Lampasas	218.4	351.5	Loop 257 east (4th Street) – Lampasas Downtown Historic District	
Lampasas	Lampasas	218.7	352.0	FM 580 west (North Avenue) – Colorado Bend State Park	South end of FM 580 overlap
Lampasas	Lampasas	219.3	352.9	FM 580 east (East Avenue J)	North end of FM 580 overlap
Lampasas		219.9	353.9	US 281 north – Hamilton	North end of US 281 overlap
Lampasas		234.4	377.2	FM 3415 south	
Lampasas	Lometa	235.0	378.2	US 190 west – San Saba	North end of US 190 overlap
Lampasas	Lometa	235.6	379.2	FM 581	
Lampasas	Lometa	235.8	379.5	FM 2942 north (Elm Street)	
Mills	Goldthwaite	255.1	410.5	SH 16 south – San Saba	South end of SH 16 overlap
Mills	Goldthwaite	255.4	411.0	Loop 15 east	
Mills	Goldthwaite	255.7	411.5	FM 574 west	
Mills	Goldthwaite	256.8	413.3	US 84 east – Evant, Gatesville	South end of US 84 overlap
see US 84
Brown	Early	288.4	464.1	US 67 south / US 84 west / US 377 south – Brownwood	North end of US 67 / US 84 / US 377 overlap
Brown		298.5	480.4	FM 1467 east – Blanket	
Brown		301.1	484.6	FM 2273 west	
Brown	May	305.7	492.0	FM 1689 east	
Brown		307.2	494.4	FM 583 north	
Eastland	Rising Star	314.4	506.0	SH 36 – Cross Plains, Comanche	
Eastland		319.6	514.3	FM 2731 west	
Eastland		326.5	525.5	FM 2526 west	South end of FM 2526 overlap
Eastland		327.0	526.3	FM 2526 east – Carbon	North end of FM 2526 overlap
Eastland	Cisco	333.8	537.2	I-20 – Abilene, Eastland	I-20 exit 332
Eastland	Cisco	334.9	539.0	US 183 Truck north / SH 6 south / SH 206 south – Eastland	South end of SH 6 overlap
Eastland	Cisco	335.0	539.1	SH 6 north – Albany	North end of SH 6 overlap
Eastland	Cisco	335.3	539.6	US 183 Truck south to SH 206	
Eastland		342.4	551.0	FM 3101 south – Eastland	
Eastland		344.2	553.9	SH 112 south – Eastland	
Stephens		352.2	566.8	FM 1032 west	
Stephens		356.4	573.6	FM 576 east	South end of FM 576 overlap
Stephens		357.1	574.7	FM 576 west	North end of FM 576 overlap
Stephens		361.1	581.1	FM 2231	
Stephens	Breckenridge	362.8	583.9	US 180 (Walker Street) – Albany, Palo Pinto	
Stephens	Breckenridge	363.7	585.3	FM 287 south	
Stephens		366.2	589.3	FM 578 north	
Stephens		373.9	601.7	FM 1481 east	
Throckmorton		381.5	614.0	FM 3327 east (Jones Road)	
Throckmorton	Woodson	383.8	617.7	FM 209 west	South end of FM 209 overlap
Throckmorton	Woodson	383.9	617.8	FM 209 east – Graham	North end of FM 209 overlap
Throckmorton	Woodson	384.7	619.1	FM 1710 north	
Throckmorton		390.5	628.4	FM 923 north	
Throckmorton		392.9	632.3	US 283 south – Albany	South end of US 283 overlap
Throckmorton		395.5	636.5	FM 923	
Throckmorton	Throckmorton	399.5	642.9	US 380 / SH 79 begins – Haskell, Graham	South end of SH 79 overlap
Throckmorton	Throckmorton	400.5	644.5	SH 79 north – Olney	North end of SH 79 overlap
Baylor	Seymour	428.6	689.8	US 277 south – Munday	South end of US 277 overlap
Baylor	Seymour	429.1	690.6	Bus. US 183 north (Main Street / US 277 Bus. north / US 283 Bus. north)	Interchange; south end of freeway; no northbound entrance
Baylor	Seymour	429.5	691.2	SH 114 – Seymour, Olney	No southbound entrance
Baylor	Seymour	430.9	693.5	FM 422 – Seymour, Archer City	Access to Seymour Hospital
Baylor	Seymour	432.3	695.7	US 82 west / Bus. US 183 south (US 277 Bus. south / US 283 Bus. south) – Seymour, Lubbock	South end of US 82 overlap; north end of freeway
Baylor	Mabelle	439.7	707.6	US 82 east / US 277 north / FM 1790 south – Wichita Falls	North end of US 82 / US 277 overlap
Wilbarger		462.4	744.2	FM 1763 north – Harrold, Electra	
Wilbarger		467.2	751.9	FM 2585 west	
Wilbarger		470.2	756.7	FM 433 west – Lockett	South end of FM 433 overlap
Wilbarger		471.4	758.6	FM 433 east – Oklaunion	North end of FM 433 overlap
Wilbarger	Vernon	475.0	764.4	Bus. US 287 (Wilbarger Street)	
Wilbarger	Vernon	475.5	765.2	US 70 west / US 283 north / US 287 north – Altus, Amarillo	Interchange; north end of US 283 overlap; south end of US 70 / US 287 overlap; access to North Texas State Hospital
Wilbarger	see US 287				
Wilbarger		484.1	779.1	US 287 south / Loop 145 – Wichita Falls	Interchange; north end of US 287 overlap
Wilbarger		485.6	781.5	FM 370 east	
Wilbarger		488.8	786.6	FM 1763 – Harrold	
Wilbarger		491.0	790.2	US 70 east / US 183 north – Frederick, Ardmore	Continuation into Oklahoma
1.000 mi = 1.609 km; 1.000 km = 0.621 mi: Closed/former; Concurrency terminus; Incomplete access; Tolled

== See also ==
- 183A Toll Road

U.S. Route 183
Previous state: Terminus	Texas	Next state: Oklahoma
