= U.S. Route 77 Alternate =

Auxiliary highway route in Texas, United States

Alternate U.S. Highway 77
- US 77 Alt. highlighted in red

Route information
- Auxiliary route of US 77
- Maintained by TxDOT
- Length: 29.141 mi (Note: The official mileage in the TxDOT designation file does not include the concurrency with US 183.) (46.898 km)
- Existed: 1953–present

Major junctions
- South end: Future I-69E / US 77 / US 183 in Refugio
- Future I-69W / US 59 in Goliad; US 87 in Cuero; US 183 near Edgar; US 90 Alt. near Hallettsville
- North end: US 77 / US 90 Alt. in Hallettsville

Location
- Country: United States
- State: Texas

Highway system
- United States Numbered Highway System; List; Special; Divided; Highways in Texas; Interstate; US; State; Former; Toll; Loops; Spurs; FM/RM; Park; Rec

U.S. Highway 77 Alternate (US 77 Alt.) is a north–south auxiliary route of US 77, located entirely within the state of Texas. The route was commissioned in 1953, when US 77 was rerouted in southeast Texas.

== Route description ==
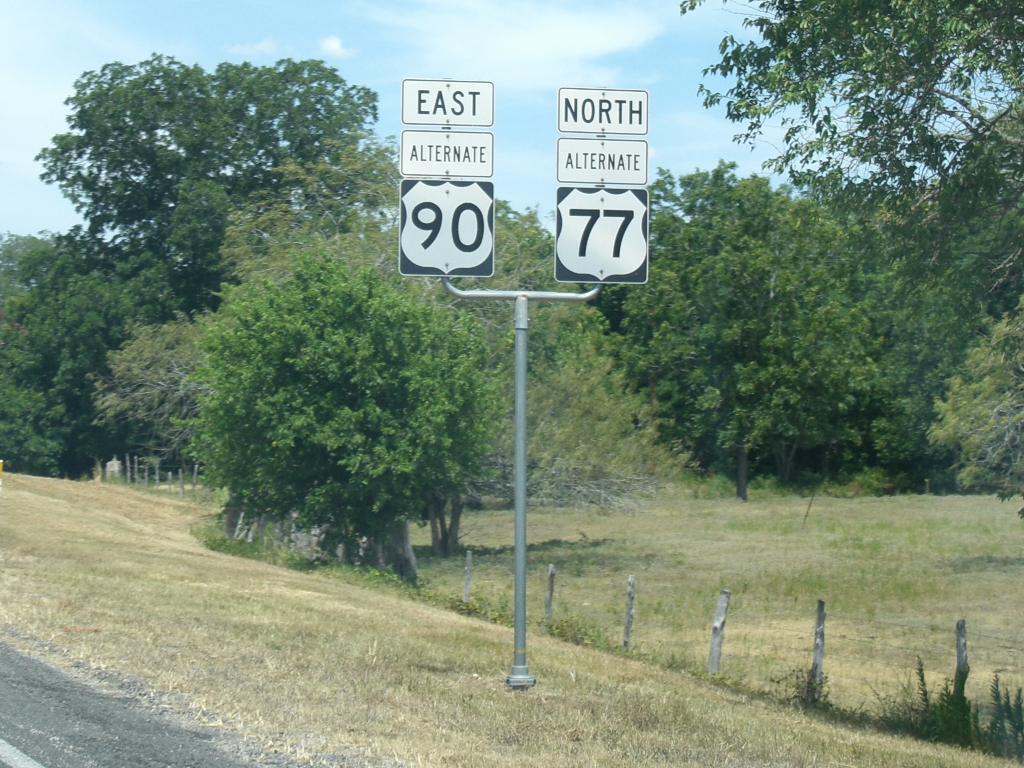
US 77 Alt. running concurrently with US 90 Alt. west of Hallettsville

US 77 Alt. begins at an intersection with US 77 (Future I-69E) in Refugio; US 183 also begins at this point and runs concurrently with US 77 Alt. for approximately 60.9 miles (98.0 km). While US 77 (Future I-69E) runs to the northeast towards Victoria, US 183/US 77 Alt. travels more to the north, through unincorporated Refugio County and into Goliad County. The highway intersects State Highway 239 (SH 239) south of Goliad and runs concurrently with it until its reaches downtown Goliad and US 59 (Future I-69W); US 183/US 77 Alt. continues to the north, while westbound SH 239 turns onto southbound US 59 (Future I-69W). North of Goliad, past a junction with SH 119, it begins to travel slightly toward the northeast. The next major city is Cuero in DeWitt County; in a wrong-way concurrency, southbound US 87 merges on to northbound US 183/US 77 Alt., and the three US Highways stay merged until US 87 separates in downtown Cuero. North of Cuero, US 183 finally separates from US 77 Alt.; US 183 turns to the northwest, while US 77 Alt. turns sharply to the northeast, toward Lavaca County and Yoakum. West of Hallettsville, US 77 Alt. merges onto US 90 Alt., and the two routes stay merged until downtown Hallettsville, where US 77 Alt. ends at another intersection with US 77.

== History ==
The original routing of US 77 was to the southwest from Hallettsville, via Yoakum and Cuero, and then to the southeast to Victoria concurrent with US 87. In 1953, US 77 was transferred to the more direct north–south route to the east, replacing SH 295 between Hallettsville and Victoria; the original route from Hallettsville to Cuero was designated US 77 Alt. In order to have it connect with US 77 at both ends, US 77 Alt. was designated to run concurrently with US 183 (which had been renumbered from SH 29 in 1952) from Cuero to its southern terminus in Refugio.

== Major intersections ==
County	Location	mi	km	Destinations	Notes
Refugio	Refugio	0.0	0.0	US 77 (Future I-69E)	Southern terminus and southern end of US 183 concurrency
Refugio		1.7	2.7	SH 202 – Beeville	
Goliad		23.4	37.7	SH 239 east / FM 2441	Southern end of SH 239 concurrency
Goliad		24.1	38.8	Loop 71	
Goliad		24.3	39.1	Loop 71	
Goliad	Goliad	24.9	40.1	PR 6 – Goliad State Park	
Goliad	Goliad	25.8	41.5	US 59 (Future I-69W) / SH 239 west	Northern end of SH 239 concurrency
Goliad		30.1	48.4	FM 622	
Goliad		34.8	56.0	SH 119 – Yorktown	
Goliad	Weser	39.6	63.7	FM 1961 – Ander	
DeWitt		43.6	70.2	FM 237 – Yorktown	
DeWitt		53.3	85.8	FM 2718	
DeWitt		53.8	86.6	US 87 north – Nixon	Southern end of US 87 concurrency
DeWitt	Cuero	56.3	90.6	SH 72 – Yorktown	
DeWitt	Cuero	56.8	91.4	FM 236	
DeWitt	Cuero	57.2	92.1	US 87 south – Victoria	Northern end of US 87 concurrency
DeWitt	Cuero	57.6	92.7	FM 766	
DeWitt	Cuero	57.7	92.9	FM 1447	
DeWitt		60.9	98.0	US 183 north – Gonzales	Northern end of US 183 concurrency
DeWitt		71.6	115.2	Bus. US 77 Alt. – Yoakum	
DeWitt	Yoakum	73.6	118.4	SH 111 – Gonzales, Edna	
Lavaca	Yoakum	74.0	119.1	Bus. US 77 Alt.	
Lavaca	Yoakum	75.6	121.7	SH 95 / FM 3475 – Shiner	
Lavaca		79.9	128.6	FM 531	
Lavaca		87.1	140.2	US 90 Alt. west – Shiner	Southern end of US 90 Alt. concurrency
Lavaca		88.1	141.8	FM 340	
Lavaca	Hallettsville	90.4	145.5	US 77 / US 90 Alt. east – Schulenburg, Eagle Lake	Northern terminus and northern end of US 90 Alt. concurrency
1.000 mi = 1.609 km; 1.000 km = 0.621 mi: Concurrency terminus

== Business route ==
Business Alternate U.S. Highway 77-Q
- Location: Yoakum, Texas
- Length: 2.921 mi (4.701 km)

US 77 Alt. has one business route in Yoakum. Officially designated by TxDOT as Business US 77-Q, it is signed with two auxiliary banners as Business Alternate US 77 (Bus. US 77 Alt.). The route was originally established as Loop 51 in 1939 and was redesignated in 1991. The route begins at US 77 Alt. south of Yoakum, then travels northwest into the city along Huck Street. It then turns north along Irvine Street, and has a brief concurrency with SH 111. It then turns northwest along Gonzales Street to an intersection with mainline US 77 Alt.

== See also ==
- List of U.S. Highways in Texas
- List of special routes of the United States Numbered Highway System
