= Texas State Highway 138 =

State highway in Texas

State Highway 138
- SH 138 highlighted in red

Route information
- Maintained by TxDOT
- Length: 6.9 mi (11.1 km)
- Existed: 1988–present

Major junctions
- West end: US 183 near Briggs
- East end: SH 195 near Florence

Location
- Country: United States
- State: Texas
- Counties: Williamson

Highway system
- Highways in Texas; Interstate; US; State; Former; Toll; Loops; Spurs; FM/RM; Park; Rec
← SH 137	→ SH 139

State Highway 138 (SH 138) is a state highway that runs between U.S. Highway 183 and SH 195 across northern Williamson County, Texas. The highway was originally part of SH 195. When SH 195 was redirected north of Florence to Killeen over RM 440 on January 27, 1988, this portion was redesignated as SH 138.

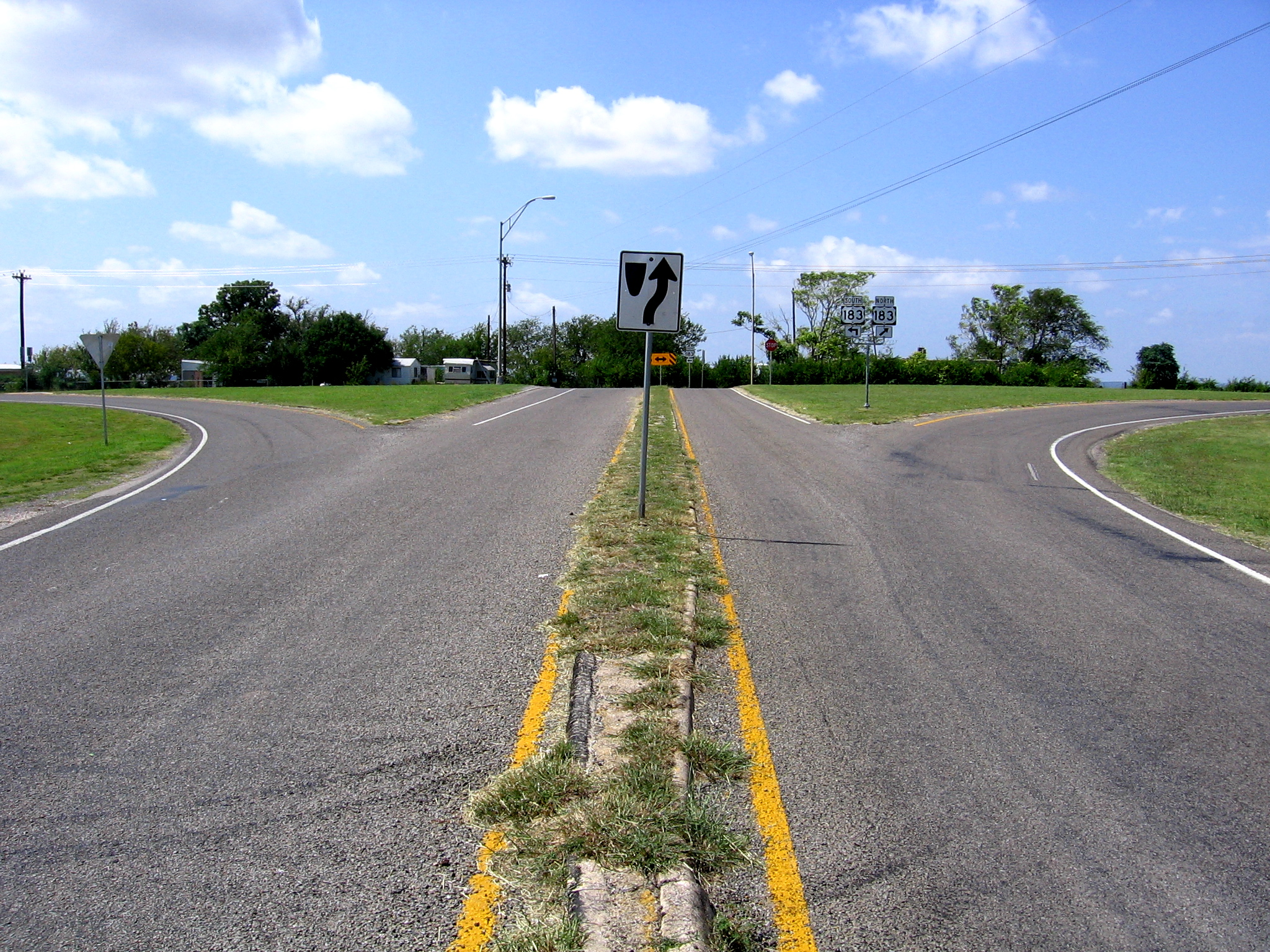
Western terminus of SH 138

== Route description ==
SH 138 begins at an intersection with US 183 in rural Williamson County, near the Burnet County line. It two lanes wide and travels east with some curves passing through no incorporated municipalities. North of Florence, it intersects Business SH 195, the former alignment of SH 195. About 0.6 miles (0.97 km) later, it ends at an interchange with SH 195 which opened in 2014 as a part of improvements made to SH 195 corridor.

== History ==
SH 138 was previously designated on July 31, 1929, as a short connector route in Childress County from near Buck Creek to the Oklahoma state line along what would shortly be cosigned with U.S. Highway 62. On September 26, 1939, the designation had been cancelled in favor of US 62.

== Junction list ==
The entire highway is in Williamson County.

Location	mi	km	Destinations	Notes
	0.0	0.0	US 183 – Austin, Lampasas	
	6.4	10.3	Bus. SH 195 – Florence, Killeen	
	6.8– 6.9	10.9– 11.1	SH 195 – Georgetown, Killeen	Interchange
1.000 mi = 1.609 km; 1.000 km = 0.621 mi
