= Ander-Weser-Kilgore, Texas =

Census-designated place in Texas, US

Ander-Weser-Kilgore is a census-designated place in Goliad County, Texas, United States. Relegated as such in 2000 with a population of 322, it combines the unincorporated communities Ander, Weser, and Kilgore.
