= Texas State Highway 119 =

State highway in Texas

State Highway 119
- SH 119, highlighted in red

Route information
- Maintained by TxDOT
- Length: 48.99 mi (78.84 km)
- Existed: 1928–present

Major junctions
- West end: US 87 / SH 97 at Stockdale
- East end: US 183 / US 77 Alt. near Goliad

Location
- Country: United States
- State: Texas

Highway system
- Highways in Texas; Interstate; US; State; Former; Toll; Loops; Spurs; FM/RM; Park; Rec
← SH 118	→ SH 120

State Highway 119 (SH 119) is a state highway in the U.S. state of Texas that runs from Stockdale to U.S. Highway 77 Alternate/U.S. Highway 183 (US 77 Alt./US 183) north of Goliad.

== Route description ==
SH 119 begins at an intersection with US 87 and State Highway 97 (SH 97) just southeast of the city of Stockdale. It travels southeast through farm and ranchland before reaching Yorktown. The route continues southeast, passing through the unincorporated town of Weesatche before reaching its southern terminus at an intersection with US 183 and US 77 Alt., about 9 miles north of Goliad.

== History ==
The route was originally proposed on August 24, 1925 from Stockdale to Goliad. Construction started on December 21, 1926, and the highway was officially numbered 119. On January 16, 1928, the section north of Yorktown was cancelled. On February 24, 1930, it was extended south to Goliad State Park. The route was completed by 1933, and on June 5, 1933 was proposed to be extended southward to Refugio. On March 19, 1934, the section from Weesatche south to Goliad, along with the extension south to Refugio, was transferred to SH 29, which was being extended southward from Cuero. On August 1, 1936, SH 119 was extended north to SH 112 (this section of SH 112 became part of SH 80 on September 22, 1936; restoring part of the section deleted on January 16, 1928). On August 1, 1946, SH 119 was extended north to Stockdale (restoring the section deleted on January 16, 1928), completing its current route.

== Counties and junctions ==
County	Location	mi	km	Destinations	Notes
Wilson	Stockdale	0.00	0.00	US 87 / SH 97 – San Antonio, Cuero, Floresville, Gonzales	Western terminus
Wilson	Denhawken	4.04	6.50	FM 1347 – Kosciusko, Pandora	
Karnes	Gillett	13.64	21.95	SH 80 – Nixon, Karnes City	
DeWitt		30.25	48.68	FM 108 north – Smiley	
DeWitt		30.30	48.76	VFW Road	
DeWitt	Yorktown	33.72	54.27	SH 72 – Runge, Cuero	
DeWitt		35.41	56.99	FM 884 south	
Goliad	Weesatche	43.94	70.71	FM 884 east	West end of FM 884 overlap
Goliad	Weesatche	43.91	70.67	FM 884 west	East end of FM 884 overlap
Goliad		48.77	78.49	US 183 / US 77 Alt. north – Cuero	
Goliad		48.96	78.79	US 183 / US 77 Alt. south – Goliad	Eastern terminus
1.000 mi = 1.609 km; 1.000 km = 0.621 mi
