= Texas State Highway 239 =

State highway in Texas

State Highway 239
- SH 239, highlighted in red

Route information
- Maintained by TxDOT
- Length: 66.826 mi (107.546 km)
- Existed: 1936–present

Major junctions
- West end: SH 72 east of Kenedy
- Future I-69W / US 59 west of Goliad; US 183 / US 77 Alt. south of Goliad; Future I-69E / US 77 in McFaddin
- East end: FM 774 in Austwell

Location
- Country: United States
- State: Texas

Highway system
- Highways in Texas; Interstate; US; State; Former; Toll; Loops; Spurs; FM/RM; Park; Rec
← SH 238	→ SH 240

State Highway 239 (SH 239) is a Texas state highway that runs from Kenedy southeastward to Austwell. The route was designated on December 22, 1936, cancelled temporarily on March 31, 1938, and redesignated on November 13, 1939. It was extended twice, once on February 28, 1966, from U.S. Highway 183 to U.S. Highway 77 (Future Interstate 69E) and again on November 25, 1975, it was extended southeast, replacing SH 113.

== Junction list ==
County	Location	mi	km	Destinations	Notes
Karnes				SH 72	
Karnes				FM 2509	
Goliad				FM 2442	
Goliad				FM 81	
Goliad				FM 2043	
Goliad				FM 2043	
Goliad				US 59 (Future I-69W)	West end of Future I-69W/US 59 overlap
Goliad	Goliad			US 59 (Future I-69W) / US 183 / US 77 Alt. / FM 2441	East end of Future I-69W/US 59 overlap; West end US 183/US 77 Alt. overlap
Goliad				US 183 / US 77 Alt.	East end US 183/US 77 Alt. overlap
Refugio				Future I-69E / US 77	U.S. 77 is the future Interstate 69E
Refugio	Tivoli			SH 35	West end of SH 35 concurrency
Refugio				SH 35	East end of SH 35 concurrency
Refugio				FM 3035	
Refugio	Austwell			FM 774	
1.000 mi = 1.609 km; 1.000 km = 0.621 mi: Concurrency terminus
