= Martinez Creek =

Martinez Creek may refer to the following watercourses:

California

- Martinez Creek (S. Fork San Jacinto River), is a stream in Riverside County, California

Texas

- Martinez Creek (San Antonio, Texas) in San Antonio, Bexar County, Texas.
- Martinez Creek (Wilson and Bexar counties, Texas) with source near Martinez in Bexar County, Texas, and mouth in Wilson County, Texas.
- Martinez Creek (Goliad County) near Goliad, Goliad County, Texas.
