= Weesatche, Texas =

- Unincorporated community
- Location within Texas Location within the United States
- Coordinates: 28°50′50″N 97°26′53″W
- Country: United States
- State: Texas
- County: Goliad
- Elevation: 233 ft (71 m)
- Time zone: UTC-6 (Central (CST))
  - Summer (DST): UTC-5 (CDT)
- ZIP codes: 77993

Weesatche (/ˈwiːsætʃ/ WEE-satch) is an unincorporated community in northern Goliad County, Texas, United States. It lies along State Highway 119 north of the city of Goliad, the county seat of Goliad County. Its elevation is 233 feet (71 m). Although Weesatche is unincorporated, it has a post office, with the ZIP code of 77993. The community is part of the Victoria, Texas Metropolitan Statistical Area.

== History ==
Weesatche was founded around the year 1850 under the name of Middletown, being halfway between Clinton and Goliad, and its post office was established on 1855-11-22. However, confusion with a Middletown in Comal County led locals to rename the community after the sweet acacia tree; the community's name is a corruption of the plant's alternate name, huisache. A post office under the name of Weesatche was opened in May 1860; although it closed during the Civil War, it was restored in 1870.

== Public services ==
Local children have attended the schools of the Goliad ISD since Weesatche's schools were consolidated into that district in 1963. The community has a volunteer fire department.

== Notable person ==
- Joseph Barnard, doctor and state legislator
