= Kilgore, Goliad County, Texas =

Kilgore
- Unincorporated community
- Interactive map of Kilgore
- Location within Texas Kilgore (the United States)
- Coordinates: 28°46′11″N 97°17′48″W
- Country: United States
- State: Texas
- County: Goliad County

Kilgore is a rural unincorporated populated community located on Farm Road 622 in Goliad County, Texas, United States. It has been a part of the Ander-Weser-Kilgore census-designated place since 2000.

== History ==
The community was established by German immigrants as a farming settlement in the 1880s, and it is hypothesized to have been named after Kilgore Creek nearby. Around that time, a Lutheran church called St. Paul's Lutheran Church would be established, which would then close in 1950.

A one-room school was built in 1881, which would then be its own district and had 25 students as of 1919; but it would close in 1944, when common schools in the county were merged with the Goliad school district.

In 1970, the community had a population of 150, and the population would decrease to 120 in 1990.

The community has a burial site called the Kilgore Community Cemetery.

Photograph of oil wells and stores in Kilgore, Goliad County, Texas circa April 1943.
