= Texas Cart War =

Outbreak of violence in 1857

The Texas Cart War was an outbreak of violence in 1857. Most of the violence occurred when American ox cart drivers attacked and hanged 70 Mexican ox cart drivers. The 'war' consisted of five attacks, three in July, one in September, and the last in November 1857. This attack involved Jose Huerta and Adalberto Davila. All of the attacks were on roads from San Antonio to Lavaca, Texas.

== Background ==
In the early-to mid 19th century Mexican cart drivers would charge rates that were lower than their white competitors to ship items from San Antonio, Texas, to the coast. Anglo shippers resented the competition. An attempted attack on Mexican cart drivers occurred in 1855, and there had been several other sporadic attacks by 1857.

== Attacks ==
Sustained violence began on July 3, 1857, when a group of disguised men attacked six carts, and wounded six drivers in Goliad County, Texas. In the second attack, on July 14, around 20 Americans attacked carts near Goliad. There were no injuries or fatalities. In the third attack on July 31, three Mexicans were wounded, and one American who supported the Mexican cart drivers was killed. In September, the fourth attack saw Antonio Delgado, a prominent local politician, killed. Five men died in the third, and last, major attack. There were few efforts made to stop the attacks, and word spread of a "campaign of death" against Mexicans.

John Twiggs had, as a result of the frequent attacks, begun providing armed escorts with American government shipments. On October 14, Manuel Robles Pezuela, the Ambassador of Mexico to the United States, complained to the United States federal government, estimating at least 75 Mexicans had been killed in the attacks. The United States Secretary of State, Lewis Cass, urged Elisha M. Pease, the Governor of Texas, to take action to stop the attacks. Upon Pease's request, armed escorts began traveling with the carters and the war had ended by December.
