= Angel City, Texas =

- City
- Location within Texas Location within the United States
- Coordinates: 28°42′59″N 97°32′59″W
- Country: United States
- State: Texas
- County: Goliad

Angel City is an unincorporated community in Goliad County, in the U.S. state of Texas.

== History ==
Some hold the view that Angel City was named from frequent, violent brawls, while others believe two girls wearing white seemed angelic to an early visitor. Little remains of the original community.
