= Dalhart Windberg =

American painter (born 1933)

Dalhart Windberg (born 1933 in Goliad County, Texas) is an American painter known for his use of light, color, and shadow in still life and landscape paintings.

Windberg was named for a popular entertainer of the day, Vernon Dalhart. He was in the army and did a tour of duty in Europe. In 1967, he quit working in order to paint full-time.

A Texas native, Windberg began to attract national attention in the 1960s. He studied under the Texas painter Simon Michael. Windberg was determined to paint like the masters, so he developed a way to have a smooth surface by using diluted modeling paste to prepare his painting surface. By using this technique he could duplicate the look of the masters without spending as much time on each painting.

He has executed romantic still lifes and figurative oil paintings depicting life in Texas, Mexico, Spain and Greece. There are hundreds of his original paintings and thousands of his reproduced prints and giclées in circulation dating back to the late 1960s. His art is very collectable and has adorned the walls of people not just in Texas but all over the world. Much of his art reflects his travels around Texas, Louisiana, the Rocky Mountains, many National Parks such as Yellowstone, the Grand Tetons, and Glacier National Park as well as Monument Valley. His Mediterranean paintings emulate his travels to parts of Italy and Greece. His art has encapsulated scenery including fields of bluebonnets, working cattlemen, mountain lakeside cabins, roaming buffalo and deer, streams in the mountains, snow-covered barns, night-lit farmlands, lonely windmills, coastal lighthouses, candlelit wine glasses, small fishing vessels, and other dreamlike spectacles.

Two biographies have been written about the artist: in The Paths of the Masters, published in 1978, and Dalhart Windberg - Artist of Texas, published by the University of Texas Press in 1984. Its title was bestowed on the artist by the state legislature in 1979. He has also written a book describing his "smooth surface" technique of oil painting.

Along with his sons Michael and Richard Windberg, Dalhart Windberg works in Georgetown, Texas at the Windberg Art Center. Windberg and his son Michael teach art classes, in the same manner as Windberg learned from his instructor Simon Michael. Students travel from all over the country just to get a glimpse of how Windberg paints, many of whom return time and time again, learning something new each time. Windberg has also created a line of fine art products tailored to his style of fine brush and palette knife oil painting, all of which is based on his many years of experience.

Windberg and his wife Evelyn live and work in Georgetown, Texas.
