= Denhawken, Texas =

Denhawken
- Unincorporated community
- Interactive map of Denhawken
- Location within Texas Denhawken (the United States)
- Coordinates: 29°10′31″N 97°55′09″W
- Country: United States
- State: Texas
- County: Wilson County

Denhawken is an unincorporated community located on the junction of State Highway 119 and Farm Road 1347, in eastern Wilson County, Texas, United States.

== History ==
Denhawken was established by German farmers moving from Fayette and Austin during the mid-1890s. The San Antonio and Gulf Railroad was built through the community 1898. Amenities such as stores and mills were available in the mid-1930s. By the 1980s, Denhawken had 2 stores and a church called the St. John's Lutheran Church.

The population of the community was 75 in 1947, and decreased to 46 in the late 20th century.

A community cemetery called The Denhawken Cemetery, formerly known as the Mesquite Prairie Cemetery, sits on the eastern part of the settlement.
