= Briggs, Texas =

Census-designated place in Burnet County, Texas, United States

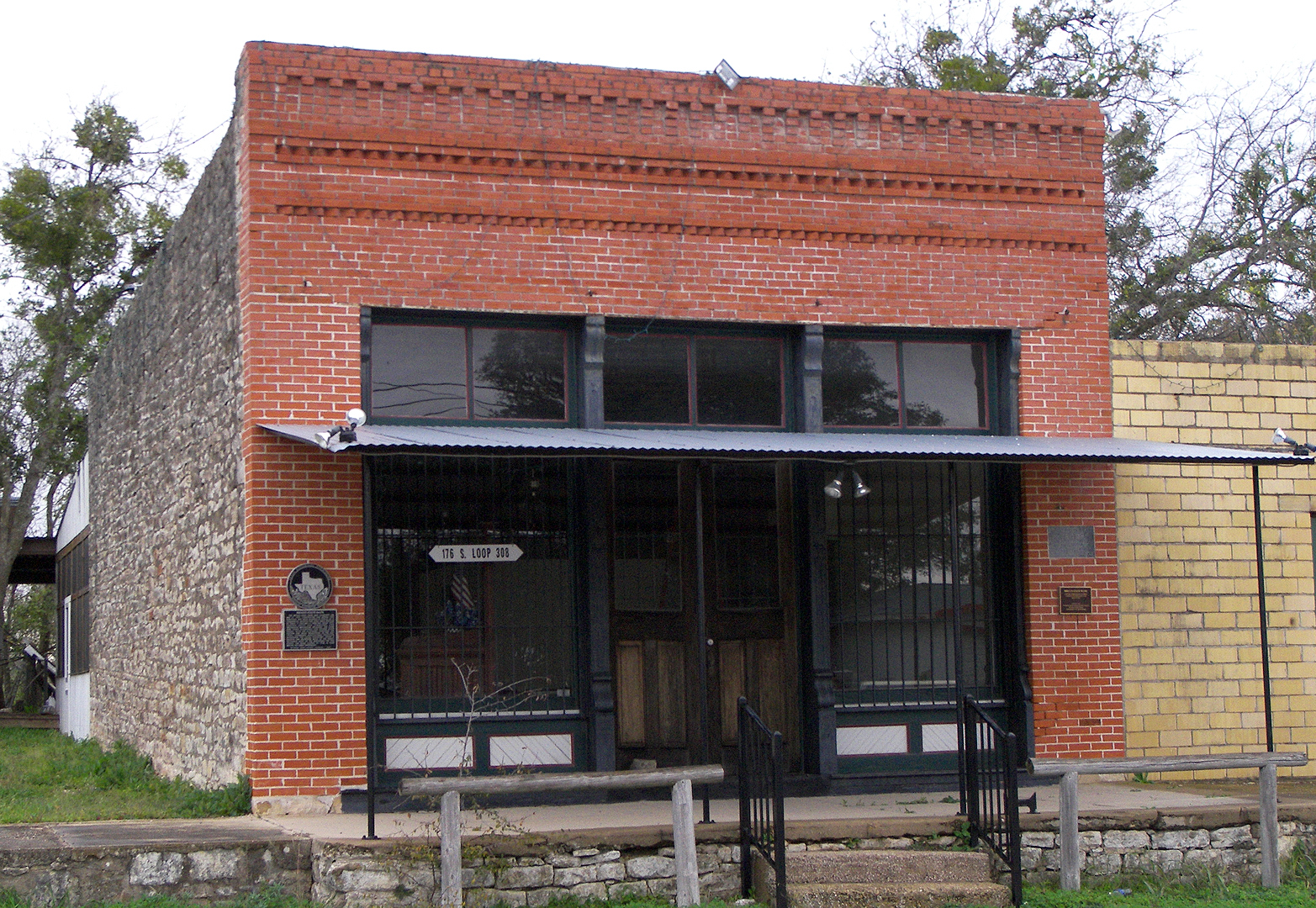
Briggs State Bank, December 2009

Briggs is an unincorporated community and census-designated place (CDP) in eastern Burnet County, Texas, United States. As of the 2020 census, Briggs had a population of 101.

== Description ==
Briggs lies along U.S. Route 183 and FM 2657, northeast of Burnet. Its elevation is 1,102 feet (336 m), and it is located at 30°53′23″N 97°55′30″W. Although Briggs is unincorporated, it has a post office, with the ZIP code of 78608. The population was 101 at the 2020 census.

== History ==
Founded as Springs, the community was soon renamed Gum Springs. The first settler in the area, a Missourian named W. T. Gann, arrived in the area in 1855, but the community was established along the Berry Creek in the last quarter of the nineteenth century. A post office was established under the name of Taylor's Gin (named for leading settler Stephen Taylor) on 27 March 1888; it did not assume its current name until 21 June 1898, when local doctor William Hazelwood was able to have the community renamed for his mother-in-law. The community prospered in the early 1900s; although major fires and the early effects of the Great Depression seriously impacted the community, it reached its zenith in population of just over five hundred in 1936, from which it has since declined to its present level of an estimated ninety residents.

Firefly Aerospace operates a test and production facility in the community.

== Climate ==
The climate in this area is characterized by hot, humid summers and generally mild to cool winters. According to the Köppen Climate Classification system, Briggs has a humid subtropical climate, abbreviated "Cfa" on climate maps.

== Demographics ==
Historical population
Census	Pop.	Note	%±
2020	101		—
U.S. Decennial Census; 1850–1900 1910; 1920 1930 1940; 1950 1960 1970; 1980 1990 2000; 2010 2020

Briggs first appeared as a census designated place in the 2020 U.S. census.

=== 2020 Census ===
Briggs CDP, Texas – Racial and ethnic composition Note: the US Census treats Hispanic/Latino as an ethnic category. This table excludes Latinos from the racial categories and assigns them to a separate category. Hispanics/Latinos may be of any race.
Race / Ethnicity (NH = Non-Hispanic)	Pop 2020	% 2020
White alone (NH)	76	75.25%
Black or African American alone (NH)	1	0.99%
Native American or Alaska Native alone (NH)	1	0.99%
Asian alone (NH)	0	0.00%
Native Hawaiian or Pacific Islander alone (NH)	0	0.00%
Other race alone (NH)	0	0.00%
Mixed race or Multiracial (NH)	3	2.97%
Hispanic or Latino (any race)	20	19.80%
Total	101	100.00%

== See also ==
- List of census-designated places in Texas
