= Ander, Texas =

Unincorporated community in Texas, US

- Unincorporated community
- Location in Texas
- Coordinates: 28.8577628°N 97.3422143°W
- Country: United States
- State: Texas
- County: Walker
- Elevation: 200 ft (60 m)

Ander, originally Hanover, is an unincorporated community in Goliad County, Texas, United States.

== History ==
Situated on Farm to Market Road 1961, Ander was settled in the early 19th century by German immigrants, who originally called it Hanover. A farming community, livestock were driven from Cuero and Yorktown. Before 1881, mail was routed to Meyersville before 1881; this changed when a post office was established in Weser, allowing for semiweekly deliveries. A post office operated there from 1900 to 1920; its opening caused the name to change to Ander—after local pastor Theodore N. Ander—due to there being a Hanover, Milam County already. After the post office closed, mail was routed to Weser until Rural Free Delivery in 1927. Through the 20th century, Ander unsteadily maintained its population; the population went from 50 to 30 following World War I, but rose to 50 following World War II, and as of 1990, had a population of 35.
