= Weser, Texas =

Weser
- Unincorporated community
- Interactive map of Weser
- Location within Texas Weser (the United States)
- Coordinates: 28°51′55″N 97°22′3″W
- Country: United States
- State: Texas
- County: Goliad County

Weser is an unincorporated community located on U.S Highway 183 in northern Goliad County, Texas, United States. It is a part of the Ander-Weser-Kilgore census-designated place.

== History ==
The community was established in 1881 at the same year when the first post office would be established, and was named after the ship that brought the first Polish immigrants into Galveston in 1854. In 1885, the town had a Lutheran church, a school, a steam gristmill, a cotton gin, a general store, and a Western Union telegraph facility. By 1892, the community had two steam gristmills, two cotton gins, two carpenters, a musician, and a saloon, and in 1900 a Sons of Herman lodge, a brass band, and a dance hall was erected in the community. A school was established in 1903, which then closed in 1942 due to its merge into the Weesatche school district.

The community primarily consists of farmers, ranchers, as well as their families. The population of the community was 153 in 1904, and remained linear until the 1920s, where citizens started emigrating to bigger cities due to high economic opportunity, causing the population of the community to drop to 50 in 1933.
