= Goliad Independent School District =

School district in Texas, United States

Address
- 161 North Welch Goliad, Texas, 77963; United States

District information
- Grades: PK–12
- Schools: 3
- NCES District ID: 4821030

Students and staff
- Students: 1,280 (2023–2024)
- Teachers: 92.06 (on an FTE basis)
- Student–teacher ratio: 13.90:1

Other information
- Website: www.goliadisd.org

Goliad Independent School District is a public school district based in Goliad, Texas (USA). The district's boundaries parallel that of Goliad County. Goliad ISD is composed of one high school, one middle school, one elementary school, and one District Alternative Education Program (DAEP), all sharing the district's name.

In 2009, the school district was rated "academically acceptable" by the Texas Education Agency.
