= Florence, Texas =

- City
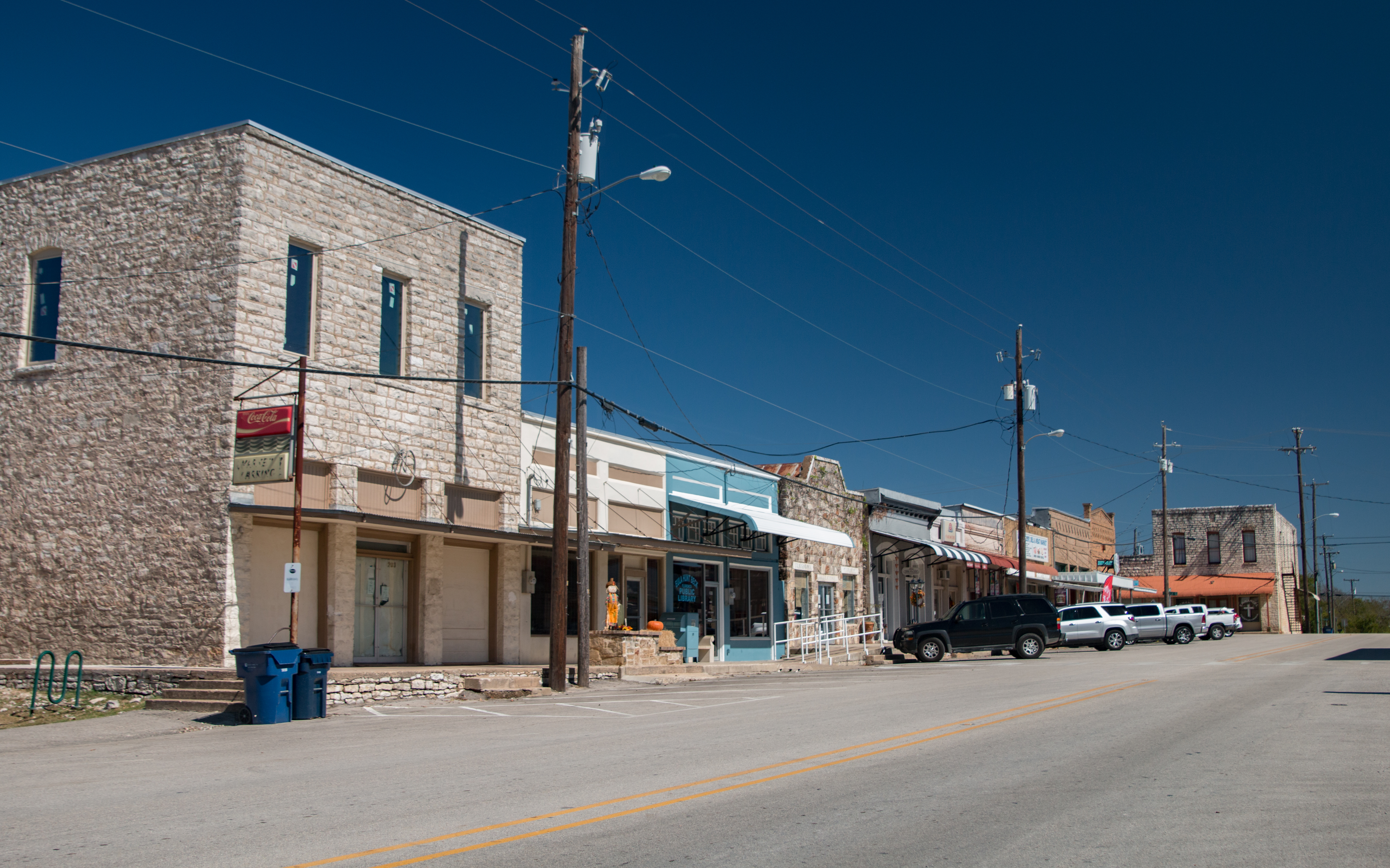
- Downtown Florence in 2019

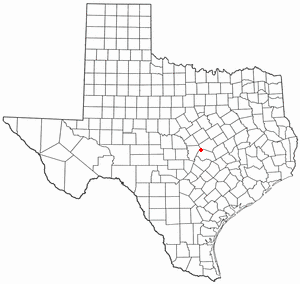
- Location of Florence in Texas

- Coordinates: 30°50′34″N 97°47′32″W
- Country: United States
- State: Texas
- County: Williamson

Government
  - Type: General Law/Type A City
  - Mayor volunteer: Mary Condon

Area
  - Total: 0.92 sq mi (2.37 km^{2})
  - Land: 0.92 sq mi (2.37 km^{2})
  - Water: 0 sq mi (0.00 km^{2})
- Elevation: 994 ft (303 m)

Population (2020)
  - Total: 1,171
  - Density: 1,394.9/sq mi (538.59/km^{2})
- Time zone: UTC-6 (Central (CST))
  - Summer (DST): UTC-5 (CDT)
- ZIP code: 76527
- Area code: 254
- FIPS code: 48-26136
- GNIS feature ID: 1357491
- Website: www.florencetex.com

Florence is a city in Williamson County, Texas, United States. Its population was 1,171 at the 2020 census. Since 2000, the territorial limits of Florence have grown by 8%. Florence is located about 13 miles (21 km) north of Georgetown and 40 miles (64 km) north of Austin in northwestern Williamson County. Florence is part of the Greater Austin metropolitan area.

== History ==
The site was settled in the early 1850s and briefly called Brooksville. By 1857, it was known as Florence, when its first post office was established.

Florence, a significant cotton-processing center, was the original destination of the Bartlett-Florence Railway, later the Bartlett Western Railroad, which ran from a connection at Bartlett with the Missouri-Kansas-Texas Railroad to Florence. However, that line, started in 1909, was abandoned in 1935.

== Geography ==
Florence is located 40 mi (64 km) north of Austin.

According to the United States Census Bureau, the city has a total area of 0.8 sq mi (2.1 km^{2}), all land.

=== Climate ===
The climate in this area is characterized by hot, humid summers and generally mild to cool winters. According to the Köppen climate classification, Florence has a humid subtropical climate, Cfa on climate maps.

Climate data for Floremce, TX (1991-2020 normals)Elevation: 986 ft (301 m). Lat: 30.8394° N Lon: 97.7928° W
Month	Jan	Feb	Mar	Apr	May	Jun	Jul	Aug	Sep	Oct	Nov	Dec	Year
Average precipitation inches (mm)	2.82 (72)	2.34 (59)	3.09 (78)	2.90 (74)	4.19 (106)	3.61 (92)	1.98 (50)	2.27 (58)	3.42 (87)	4.02 (102)	2.61 (66)	2.65 (67)	35.9 (911)
Average precipitation days (≥ 0.01 in)	5.8	5	5	4.8	5.7	4.5	2.9	3.3	4.1	4.2	4.4	5.2	54.9
Source: NOAA

== Demographics ==
Historical population
Census	Pop.	Note	%±
1880	159		—
1930	421		—
1940	476		13.1%
1950	561		17.9%
1960	610		8.7%
1970	672		10.2%
1980	744		10.7%
1990	829		11.4%
2000	1,054		27.1%
2010	1,136		7.8%
2020	1,171		3.1%
U.S. Decennial Census

=== 2020 census ===
As of the 2020 census, Florence had a population of 1,171. The median age was 33.0 years; 28.4% of residents were under 18 and 12.0% were 65 or older. For every 100 females, there were 109.9 males, and for every 100 females 18 and over, there were 110.3 males 18 and over.

None of the residents lived in urban areas, while all lived in rural areas.

Of the 418 households in Florence, 46.7% had children under 18 living in them, 45.0% were married-couple households, 22.7% were households with a male householder and no spouse or partner present, and 26.8% were households with a female householder and no spouse or partner present. About 22.0% of all households were made up of individuals, and 9.1% had someone living alone who was 65 or older.

About 8.3% of the 456 housing units were vacant. The homeowner vacancy rate was 1.1% and the rental vacancy rate was 5.1%.

Racial composition as of the 2020 census
Race	Number	Percent
White	638	54.5%
Black or African American	20	1.7%
American Indian and Alaska Native	16	1.4%
Asian	7	0.6%
Native Hawaiian and other Pacific Islander	2	0.2%
Some other race	317	27.1%
Two or more races	171	14.6%
Hispanic or Latino (of any race)	599	51.2%

=== 2000 census ===
In 2000, 1,054 people, 381 households, and 275 families were residing in the city. The population density was 1,300.1 inhabitants per square mile (502.0/km^{2}). The 410 housing units had an average density of 505.7 per square mile (195.3/km^{2}). The racial makeup of the city was 89.28% White, 0.85% African American, 1.04% Native American, 0.28% Asian, 6.74% from other races, and 1.80% from two or more races. Hispanics or Latinos of any race were 19.92% of the population.

Of the 381 households, 38.8% had children under 18 living with them, 55.4% were married couples living together, 12.6% had a female householder with no husband present, and 27.6% were not families. About 23.9% of all households were made up of individuals, and 12.3% had someone living alone who was 65 or older. The average household size was 2.77 and the average family size was 3.29.

In the city, the age distribution was 31.1% under 18, 8.6% from 18 to 24, 28.0% from 25 to 44, 18.9% from 45 to 64, and 13.4% who were 65 or older. The median age was 33 years. For every 100 females, there were 99.6 males. For every 100 females 18 and over, there were 93.1 males.

The median income for a household in the city was $36,250 and for a family was $42,059. Males had a median income of $30,500 versus $23,750 for females. The per capita income for the city was $15,964. About 9.7% of families and 14.7% of the population were below the poverty line, including 20.2% of those under age 18 and 9.2% of those age 65 or over.

== Education ==
The City of Florence is served by the Florence Independent School District. Florence High School is the only high school in Texas that has a complete meat-processing laboratory and full-service meat market.
