= Goliad, Texas =

- City
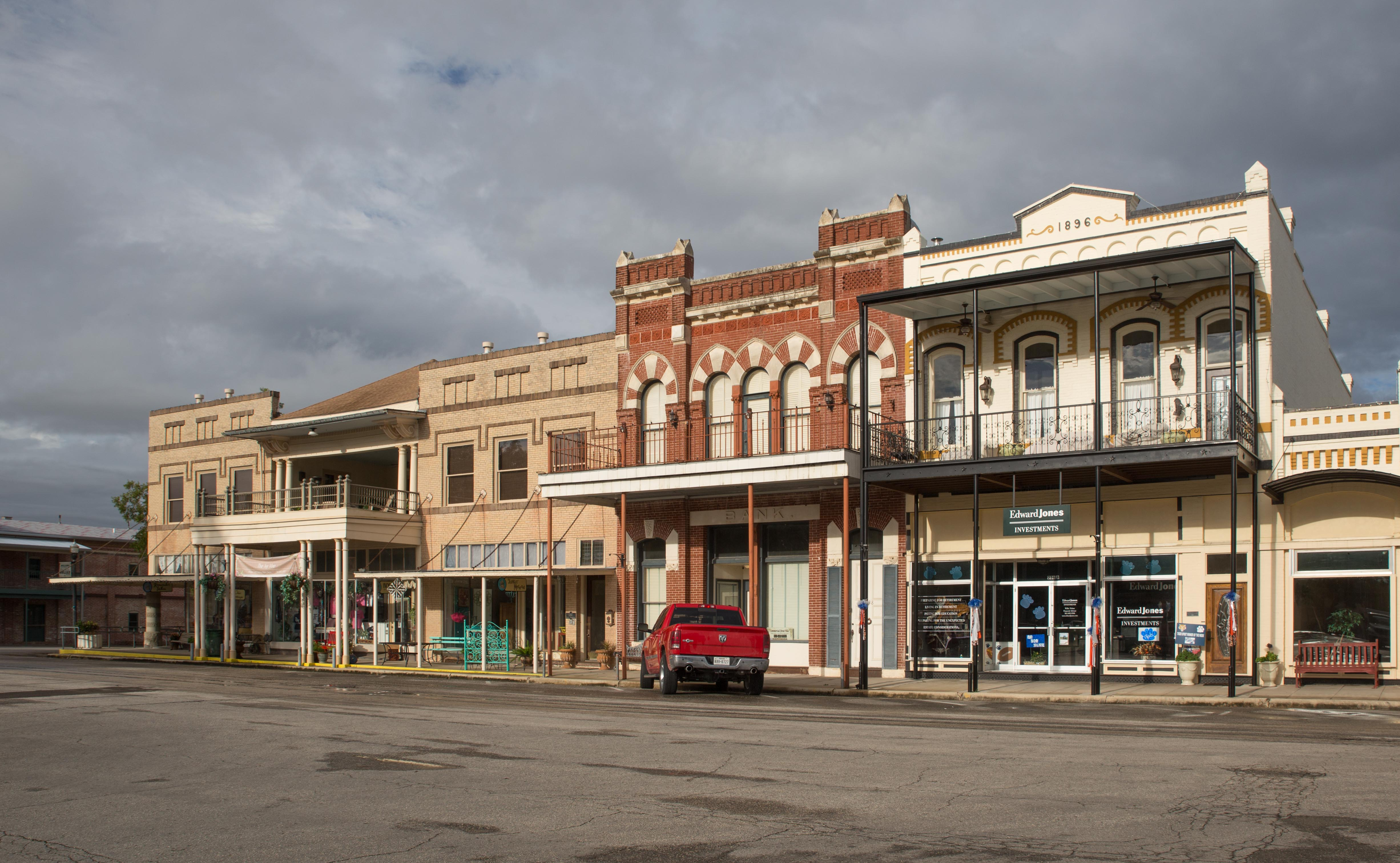
- Historic district of downtown Goliad, Texas
- Motto: "Birthplace of Texas Ranching"
- Location of Goliad, Texas
- Coordinates: 28°40′N 97°24′W
- Country: United States
- State: Texas
- County: Goliad

Area
  - Total: 1.57 sq mi (4.07 km^{2})
  - Land: 1.56 sq mi (4.05 km^{2})
  - Water: 0.0039 sq mi (0.01 km^{2})
- Elevation: 160 ft (50 m)

Population (2020)
  - Total: 1,620
  - Density: 1,040/sq mi (400/km^{2})
- Time zone: UTC-6 (Central (CST))
  - Summer (DST): UTC-5 (CDT)
- ZIP code: 77963
- Area code: 361
- FIPS code: 48-30080
- GNIS feature ID: 1358133
- Website: www.goliadtx.net

Goliad (/ˈɡoʊliæd/ GOH-lee-ad) is a city and the county seat of Goliad County, Texas, United States. It is known for the 1836 Goliad massacre during the Texas Revolution. It had a population of 1,620 at the 2020 census. It is part of the Victoria, Texas, metropolitan statistical area.

== History ==
=== Spain ===
In 1747, the Spanish government sent José de Escandón to inspect the northern frontier of its North American colonies, including Spanish Texas. In his final report, Escandón recommended the Presidio La Bahía be moved from its Guadalupe River location to the banks of the San Antonio River, so it could better assist settlements along the Rio Grande. Both the presidio and the mission that it protected, Mission Nuestra Señora del Espíritu Santo de Zúñiga, moved to their new location sometime around October 1749. Escandón proposed that 25 families from New Spain be relocated near the presidio to form a civilian settlement, but he could not find enough willing settlers.

With the conclusion of the Seven Years' War in 1763, France ceded Louisiana and its Texas claims to Spain. With France no longer a threat to the crown's North American interests, the Spanish monarchy commissioned the Marquis de Rubi to inspect all of the presidios on the northern frontier of New Spain and make recommendations for the future. Rubi recommended that several presidios be closed and that La Bahia be kept and rebuilt in stone. La Bahia was soon "the only Spanish fortress for the entire Gulf Coast from the mouth of the Rio Grande to the Mississippi River". The presidio was at the crossroads of several major trade and military routes. It quickly became one of Texas's three most important areas, along with Béxar and Nacogdoches. A civil settlement, then known as La Bahia, soon developed near the presidio. By 1804, the settlement had one of only two schools in Texas.

In early August 1812 during the Mexican War of Independence, Mexican revolutionary Bernardo Gutiérrez de Lara and his recruits, called the Republican Army of the North, invaded Texas. In November, the invaders captured Presidio La Bahia. Texas Governor Manuel María de Salcedo laid siege to the fort for the next four months. Unable to win a decisive victory, Salcedo lifted the siege on February 19, 1813, and turned toward San Antonio de Bexar. The rebels controlled the presidio until July or August 1813, when José Joaquín de Arredondo led royalist troops in retaking all of Texas. Henry Perry, a member of the Republican Army of the North, led forces back to Texas in 1817 and attempted to recapture La Bahia. The Spanish reinforced the presidio with soldiers from San Antonio, and defeated Perry's forces on June 18 near Coleto Creek.

The area was invaded again in 1821. The United States and Spain had signed the Adams–Onís Treaty in 1819, which ceded all US territorial claims on the Texas area to Spain. On October 4, the Long Expedition (with 52 members) captured La Bahia. Four days later, Colonel Ignacio Pérez arrived with troops from Bexar, and Long surrendered. By the end of 1821, Mexico had achieved its independence from Spain, and Texas became part of the newly created country.

=== Mexico ===
In 1829, the name of the Mexican Texas village of La Bahía was changed to "Goliad", believed to be an anagram of Hidalgo (omitting the silent initial "H"), in honor of the patriot priest Miguel Hidalgo, the father of the Mexican War of Independence.

On October 9, 1835, in the early days of the Texas Revolution, a group of Anglo-American immigrants attacked the presidio in the Battle of Goliad. The Mexican garrison quickly surrendered, leaving the Anglo-Americans in control of the fort. The first declaration of independence of the Republic of Texas was signed here on December 20, 1835, and immediately thereafter, Nicholas Fagan raised the "Bloody Arm Flag" also known as the "First Flag of Texas Independence" over Presidio La Bahia. Anglo-Americans held the area until March 1836, when their garrison under Colonel James Fannin was defeated at the nearby Battle of Coleto. Antonio Lopez de Santa Anna, then president of Mexico, ordered that all survivors were to be executed. On Palm Sunday, March 27, 1836, in what was later called the Goliad Massacre, 303 were marched out of the fort to be executed, and 39 were executed inside the presidio (20 prisoners were spared because they were either physicians or medical attendants); 342 men were killed and 28 escaped.

Famous Mexican General Ignacio Zaragoza was born in Goliad in 1829. He commanded the forces resisting the French Army in the Battle of Puebla, now celebrated as Cinco de Mayo on May 5, 1862.

Texas gunfighter King Fisher lived for a time in Goliad before moving to Eagle Pass in Maverick County, Texas.

=== 1902 tornado ===
The 1902 Goliad tornado devastated the town, killing 114 people, including Sheriff Robert Shaw, and injuring at least 225. It is tied for the deadliest tornado in Texas history, and remains among the deadliest in the United States. Dr. Louis Warren Chilton, a young doctor whose wife was injured and whose daughter was lifted in the tornado funnel but survived, set up a temporary hospital and morgue in the courthouse. The Dr. L.W. and Martha E.S. Chilton House was built starting in June and included an underground shelter.

== Geography ==
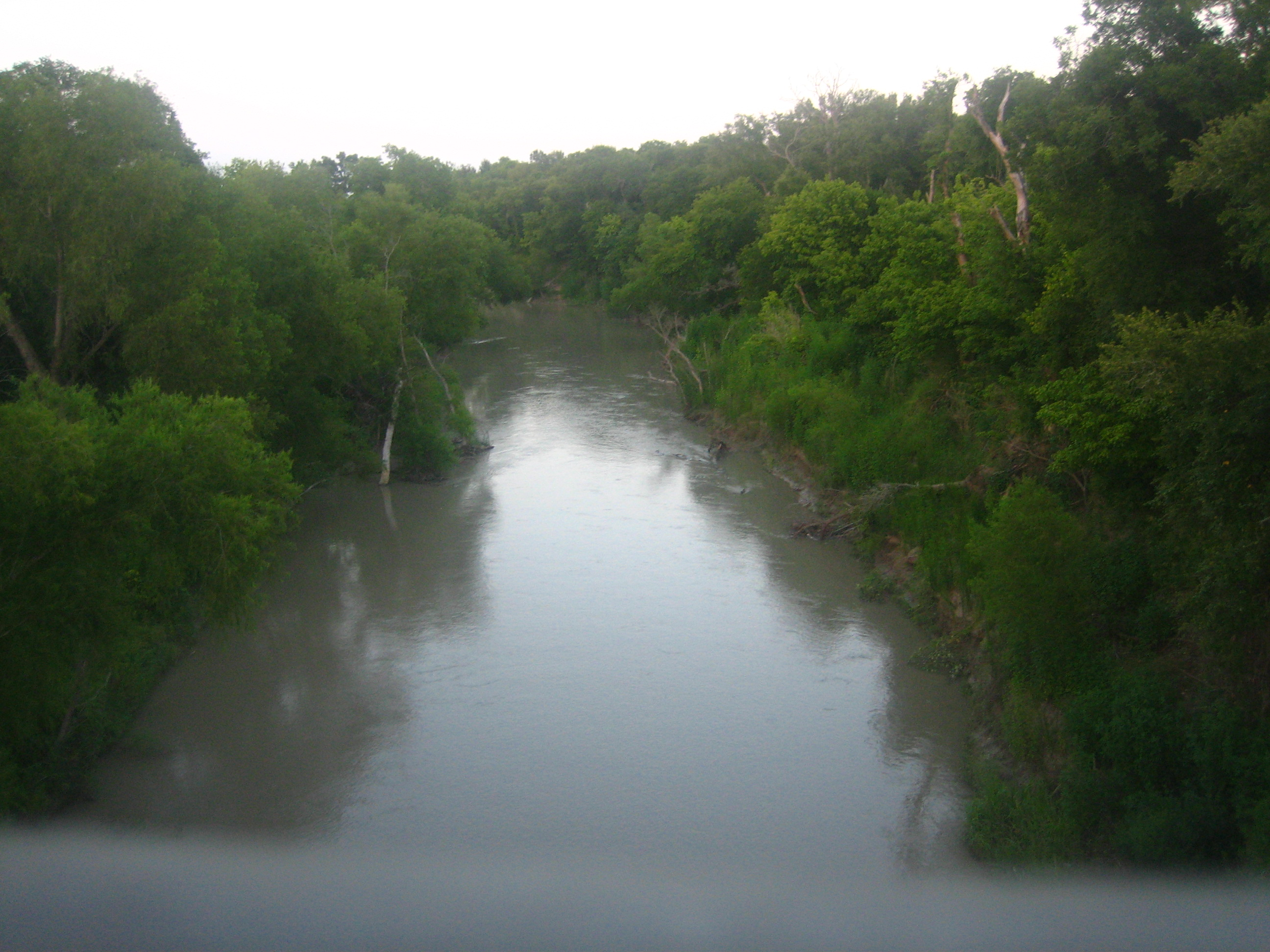
The San Antonio River flows through Goliad.

Goliad is located near the center of Goliad County at 28°40′N 97°24′W (28.669, –97.392). U.S. Route 59 passes through the center of town as Pearl Street, leading northeast 26 miles (42 km) to Victoria and southwest 29 miles (47 km) to Beeville. U.S. Route 183 (Jefferson Street) crosses US 59 northeast of the original center of town; US 183 leads north 31 miles (50 km) to Cuero and south 26 miles (42 km) to Refugio. Goliad is 91 miles (146 km) southeast of San Antonio and 68 miles (109 km) north of Corpus Christi.

According to the United States Census Bureau, the city has a total area of 1.6 square miles (4.1 km^{2}), of which 0.004 sq mi (0.01 km^{2}), or 0.28%, is covered by water. The San Antonio River flows from west to east along the southern border of the city; it is a tributary of the Guadalupe River, joining it just before their mouth at San Antonio Bay.

=== Climate ===
Climate data for Goliad, Texas (1991–2020 normals, extremes 1937–2014)
Month	Jan	Feb	Mar	Apr	May	Jun	Jul	Aug	Sep	Oct	Nov	Dec	Year
Record high °F (°C)	90 (32)	97 (36)	99 (37)	105 (41)	102 (39)	112 (44)	112 (44)	112 (44)	111 (44)	102 (39)	96 (36)	89 (32)	112 (44)
Mean daily maximum °F (°C)	65.6 (18.7)	69.6 (20.9)	75.1 (23.9)	81.1 (27.3)	86.8 (30.4)	91.6 (33.1)	94.7 (34.8)	96.1 (35.6)	90.9 (32.7)	84.3 (29.1)	74.7 (23.7)	67.5 (19.7)	81.5 (27.5)
Daily mean °F (°C)	54.4 (12.4)	58.3 (14.6)	64.3 (17.9)	70.7 (21.5)	77.1 (25.1)	82.0 (27.8)	84.3 (29.1)	85.0 (29.4)	80.5 (26.9)	72.6 (22.6)	63.2 (17.3)	56.1 (13.4)	70.7 (21.5)
Mean daily minimum °F (°C)	43.3 (6.3)	47.0 (8.3)	53.4 (11.9)	60.4 (15.8)	67.4 (19.7)	72.5 (22.5)	73.8 (23.2)	73.8 (23.2)	70.1 (21.2)	60.9 (16.1)	51.8 (11.0)	44.7 (7.1)	59.9 (15.5)
Record low °F (°C)	7 (−14)	13 (−11)	20 (−7)	32 (0)	42 (6)	55 (13)	61 (16)	61 (16)	44 (7)	23 (−5)	20 (−7)	8 (−13)	7 (−14)
Average precipitation inches (mm)	2.71 (69)	1.73 (44)	2.74 (70)	2.67 (68)	4.54 (115)	3.90 (99)	2.95 (75)	3.41 (87)	4.69 (119)	3.41 (87)	2.33 (59)	2.13 (54)	37.21 (945)
Average snowfall inches (cm)	0.0 (0.0)	0.0 (0.0)	0.0 (0.0)	0.0 (0.0)	0.0 (0.0)	0.0 (0.0)	0.0 (0.0)	0.0 (0.0)	0.0 (0.0)	0.0 (0.0)	0.0 (0.0)	0.0 (0.0)	0.0 (0.0)
Average precipitation days (≥ 0.01 in)	7.1	6.9	6.1	5.0	5.3	7.0	6.4	5.9	8.0	6.5	5.7	6.7	76.6
Average snowy days (≥ 0.1 in)	0.0	0.0	0.0	0.0	0.0	0.0	0.0	0.0	0.0	0.0	0.0	0.0	0.0
Source: NOAA

== Demographics ==
Historical population
Census	Pop.	Note	%±
1880	885		—
1930	1,424		—
1940	1,446		1.5%
1950	1,584		9.5%
1960	1,782		12.5%
1970	1,709		−4.1%
1980	1,990		16.4%
1990	1,946		−2.2%
2000	1,975		1.5%
2010	1,908		−3.4%
2020	1,620		−15.1%
U.S. Decennial Census

=== 2020 census ===
As of the 2020 census, Goliad had a population of 1,620 and 420 families residing in the city; the median age was 42.3 years, 21.7% of residents were under age 18, 24.9% were 65 years of age or older, there were 84.1 males for every 100 females, and for every 100 females age 18 and over there were 82.6 males age 18 and over.

There were 654 households in Goliad, of which 35.8% had children under age 18 living in them, 41.3% were married-couple households, 16.8% were households with a male householder and no spouse or partner present, and 35.3% were households with a female householder and no spouse or partner present. About 27.9% of all households were made up of individuals and 15.3% had someone living alone who was 65 years of age or older.

There were 795 housing units, of which 17.7% were vacant. The homeowner vacancy rate was 3.7% and the rental vacancy rate was 9.5%.

0.0% of residents lived in urban areas, while 100.0% lived in rural areas.

Racial composition as of the 2020 census
Race	Number	Percent
White	1,015	62.7%
Black or African American	113	7.0%
American Indian and Alaska Native	6	0.4%
Asian	9	0.6%
Native Hawaiian and Other Pacific Islander	0	0.0%
Some other race	168	10.4%
Two or more races	309	19.1%
Hispanic or Latino (of any race)	828	51.1%

=== 2000 census ===
As of the 2000 census, 1,975 people, 749 households, and 518 families resided in the city. The population density was 1,294.3 inhabitants per square mile (499.7/km^{2}). The 877 housing units had an average density of 574.7/sq mi (221.9/km^{2}). The racial makeup of the city was 75.44% White, 6.08% African American, 0.35% Native American, 0.61% Asian, 14.99% from other races, and 2.53% from two or more races. Hispanics or Latinos of any race were 49.72% of the population.

Of the 749 households, 33.9% had children under 18 living with them, 51.7% were married couples living together, 12.8% had a female householder with no husband present, and 30.8% were not families. About 28.7% of all households were made up of individuals, and 15.8% had someone living alone who was 65 or older. The average household size was 2.49 and the average family size was 3.04.

In the city, the age distribution was 26.3% under 18, 7.2% from 18 to 24, 24.4% from 25 to 44, 21.3% from 45 to 64, and 20.8% who were 65 or older. The median age was 39 years. For every 100 females, there were 91.0 males. For every 100 females 18 and over, there were 84.1 males.

The median income for a household in the city was $26,200, and for a family was $33,438. Males had a median income of $28,889 versus $20,167 for females. The per capita income for the city was $13,997. About 19.7% of families and 23.1% of the population were below the poverty line, including 31.5% of those under 18 and 17.6% of those 65 or over.

== Education ==
The Goliad Independent School District serves Goliad.

== Attractions ==
- The Texas Mile, a weekend motorsports racing festival, used to be held at the Goliad Airport near Berclair, TX. After the US Navy reclaimed the airport as a training field, the festival has been held at an airport in Beeville, Texas.
- Goliad Market Day (held on the second Saturday of every month) is an event where produce, arts and crafts, and other retail items are sold.
- Schroeder Hall was one of Texas' most legendary dance halls where legends including George Jones, Merle Haggard, Willie Nelson, Ray Price, and many others often performed. The hall is still presenting some of the biggest names in country music today as it has for generations.
- Goliad Brewing Company Beer Garden is open to the public Friday 5:00–9:00 pm and Saturday from 12:00–7:00 pm.

== Notable people ==
- Bum Phillips, National Football League head coach
- Dalhart Windberg, artist
- Thomas Lincoln Tally, Los Angeles movie theater proprietor and film producer, was born in Goliad.
- Ignacio Zaragoza, Secretary of War and Navy of Mexico. Head officer in the Battle of Puebla.

== Gallery ==
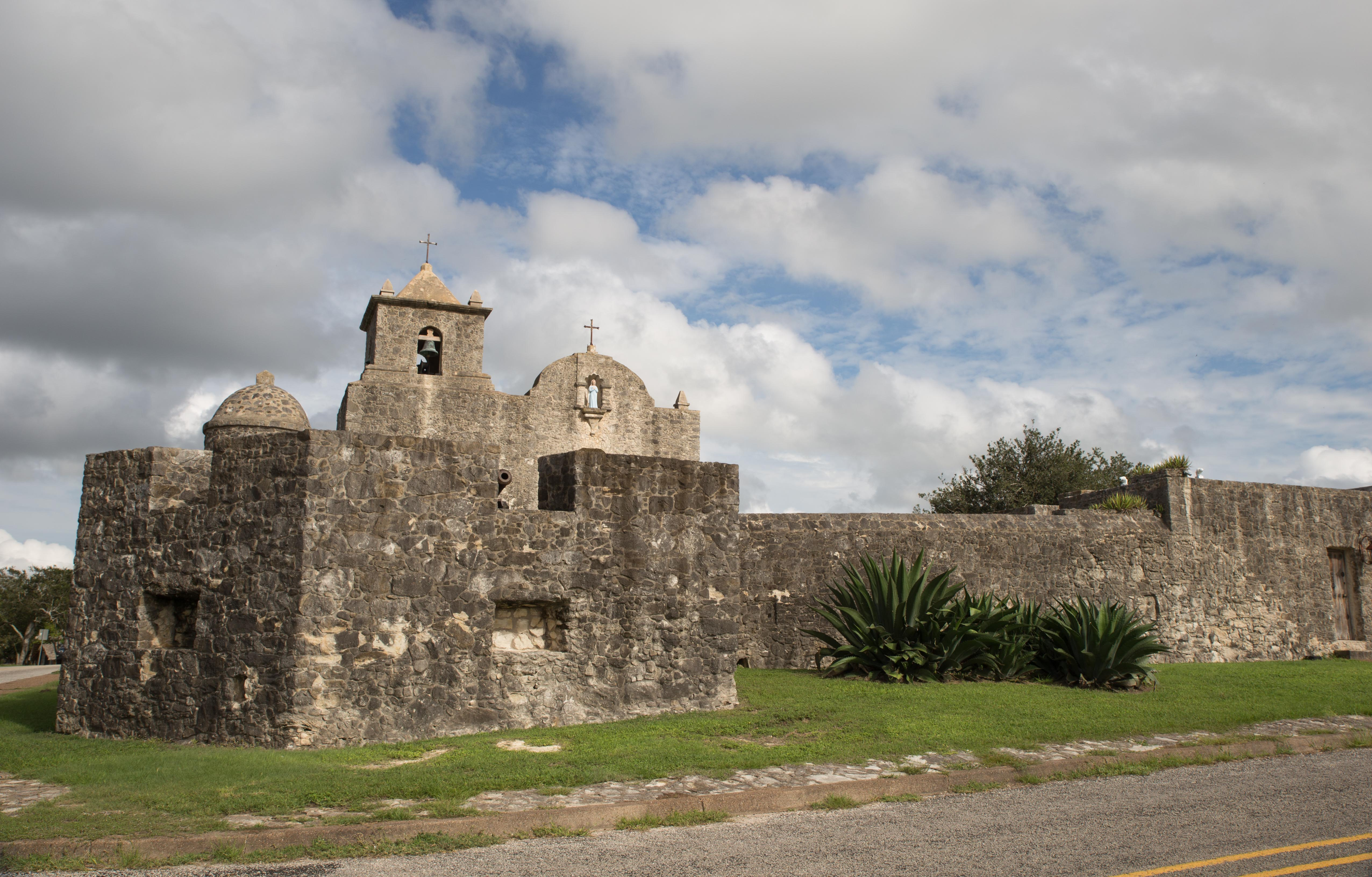
Presidio Nuestra Señora de Loreto de la Bahia

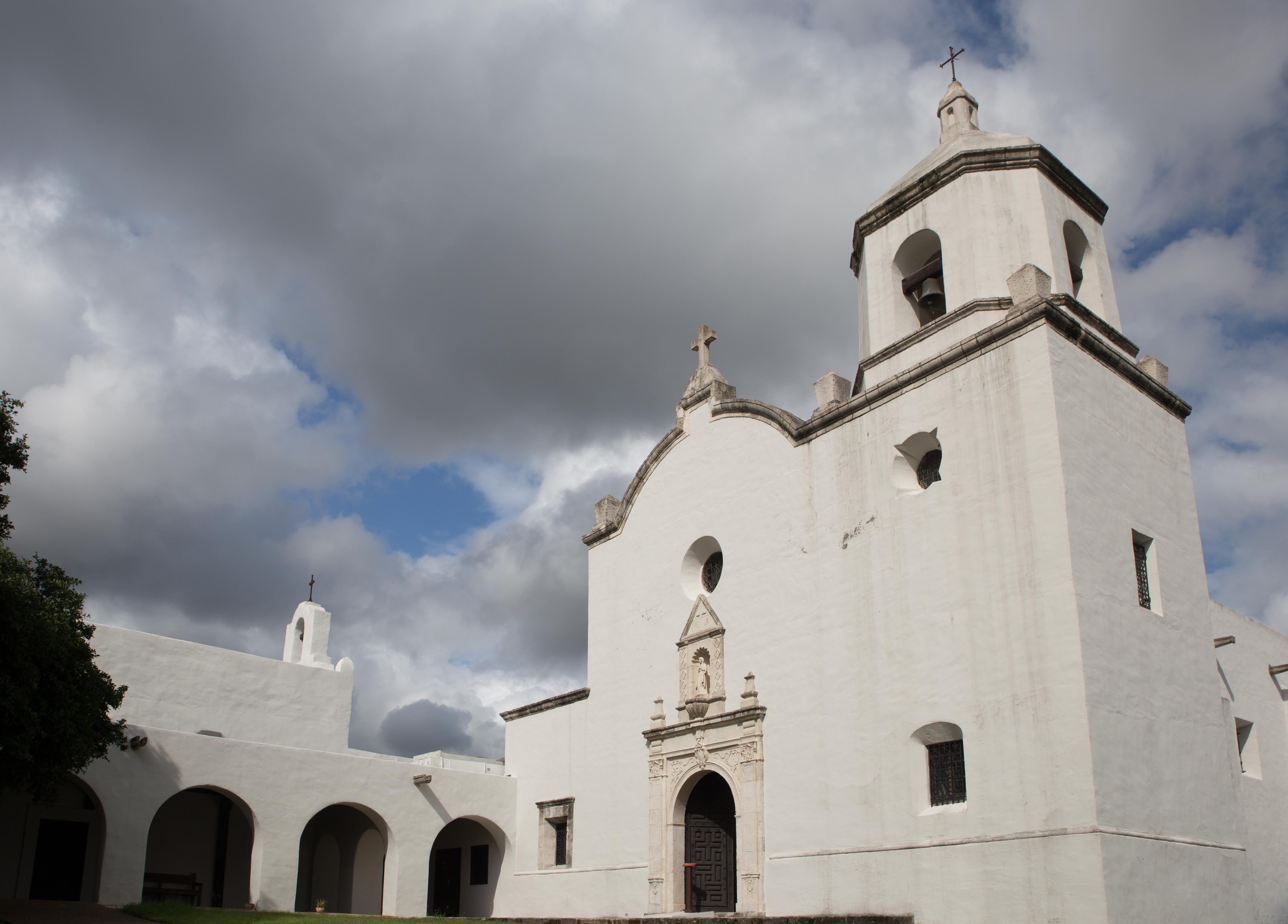
Nuestra Senora del Espiritu Santo de Zuniga site

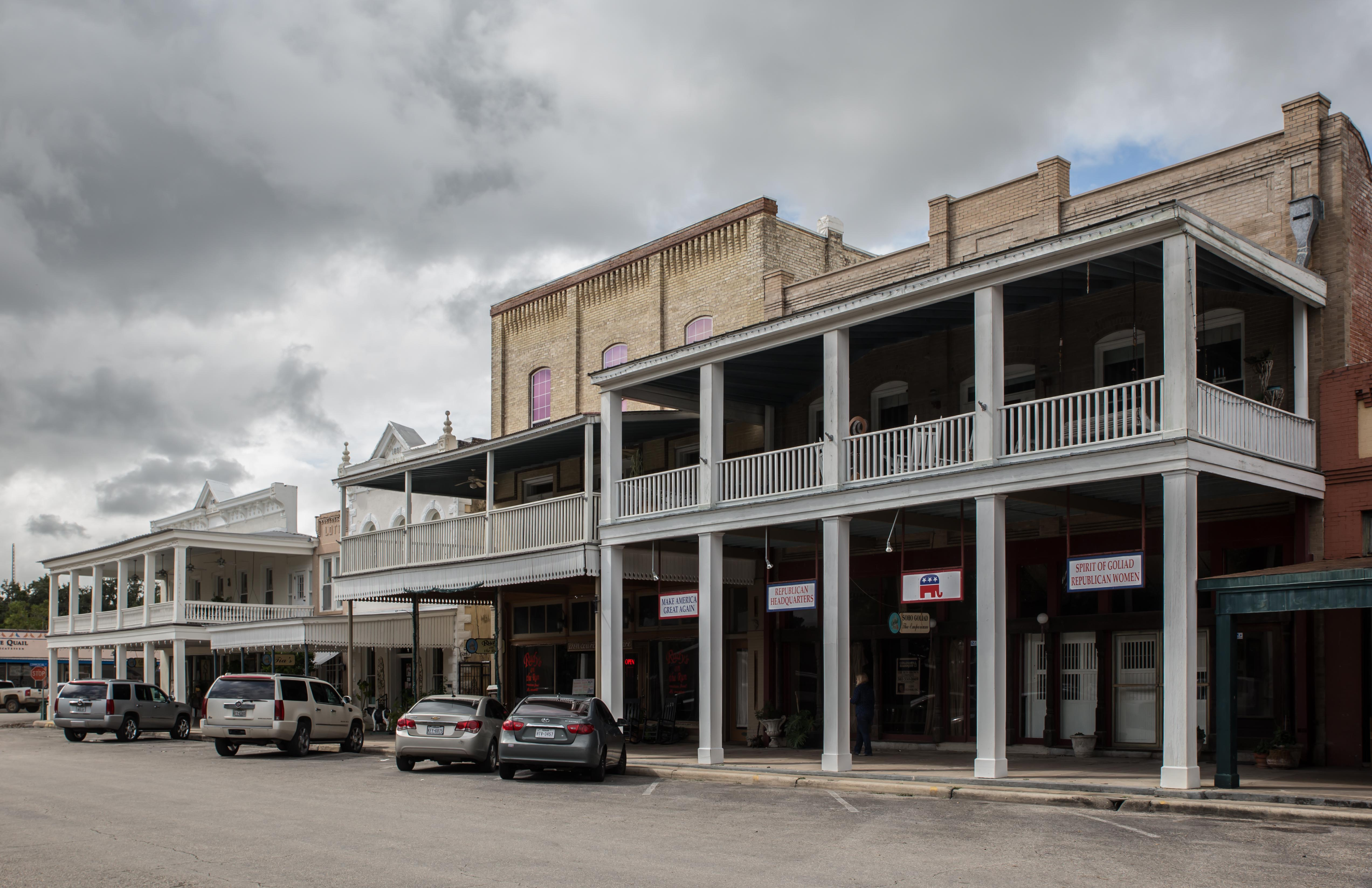
Downtown Goliad, Texas

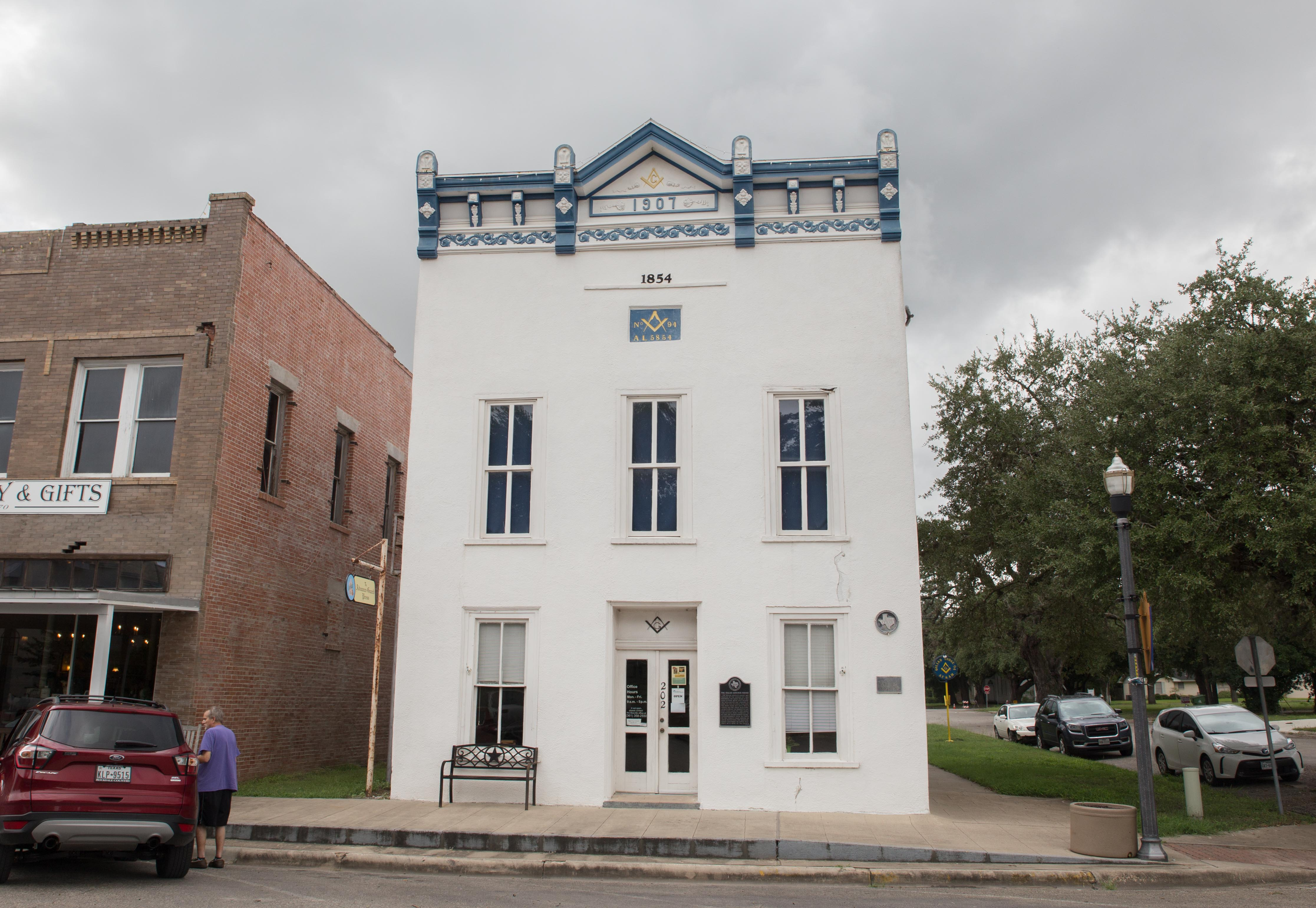
Masonic Lodge building in downtown

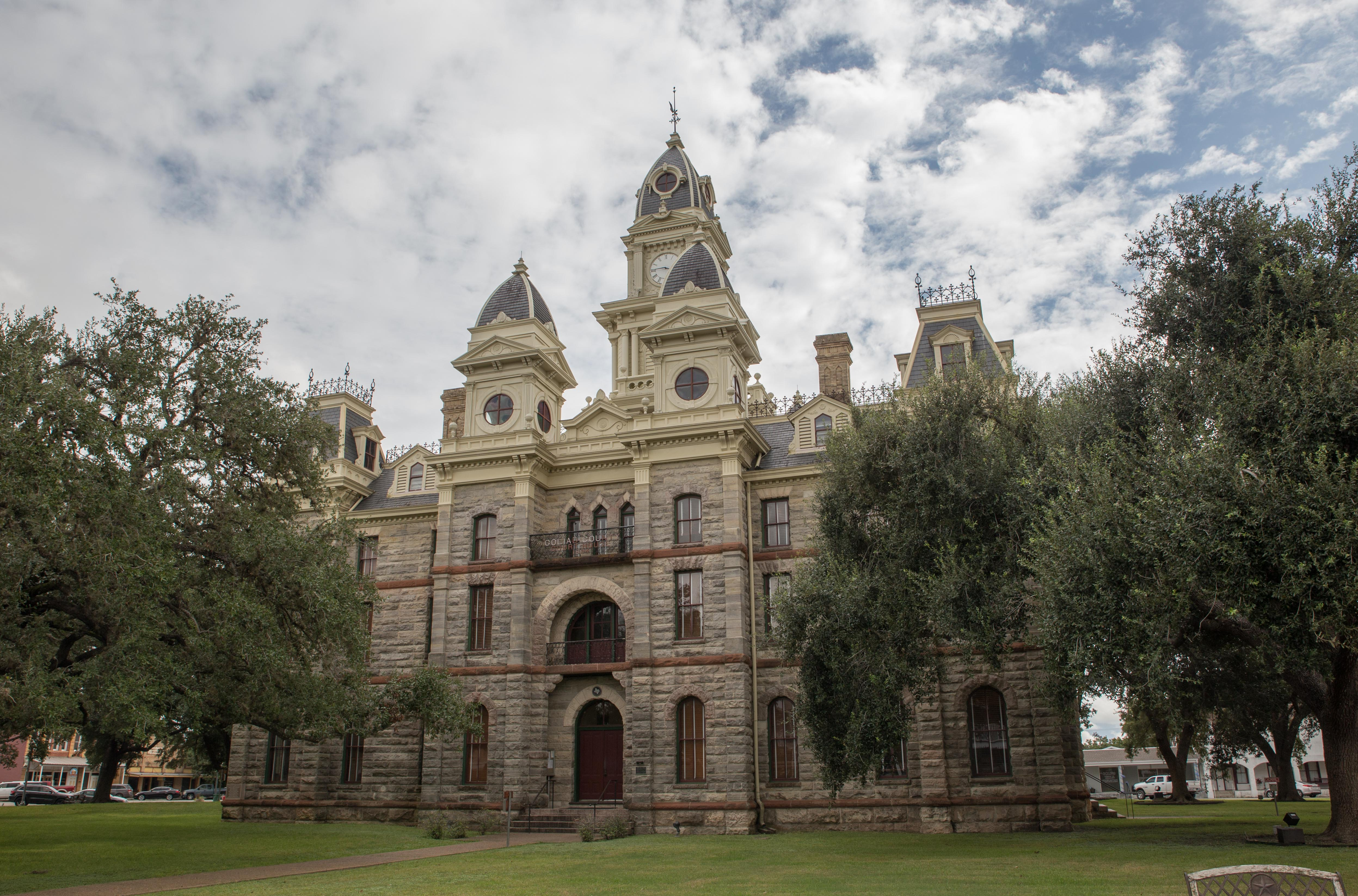
Goliad County Courthouse

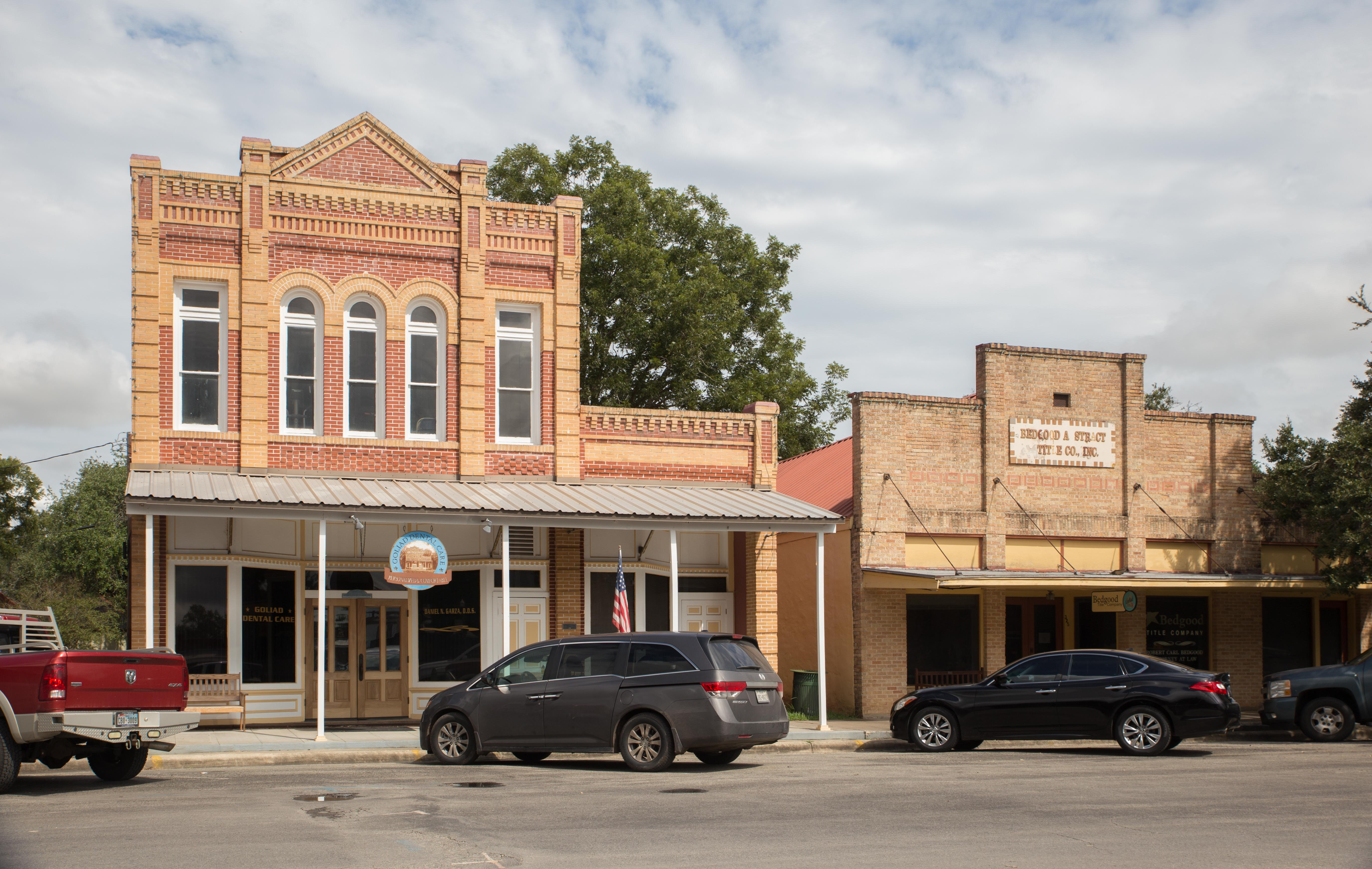
Downtown Goliad, Texas

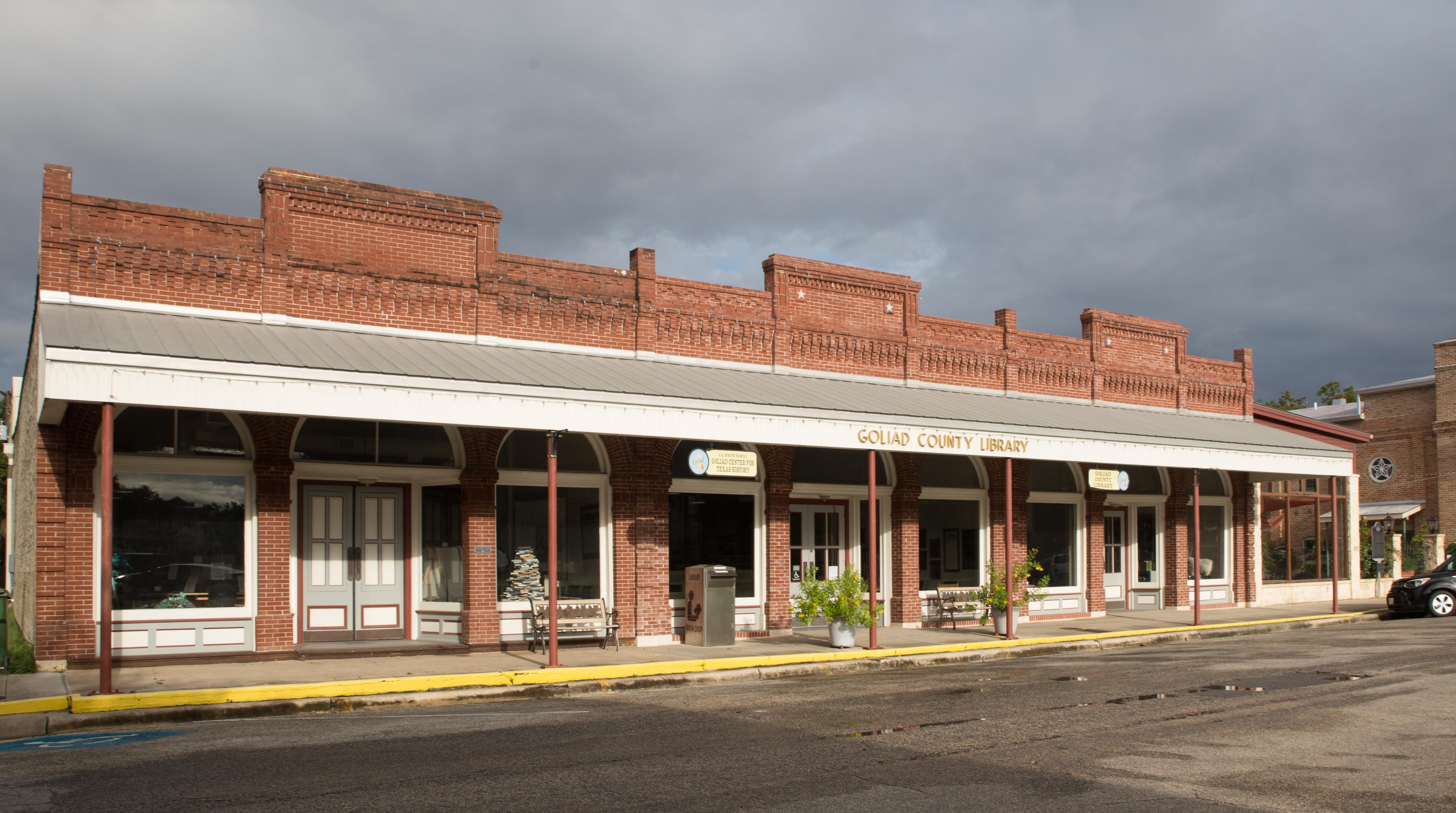
Goliad County Library

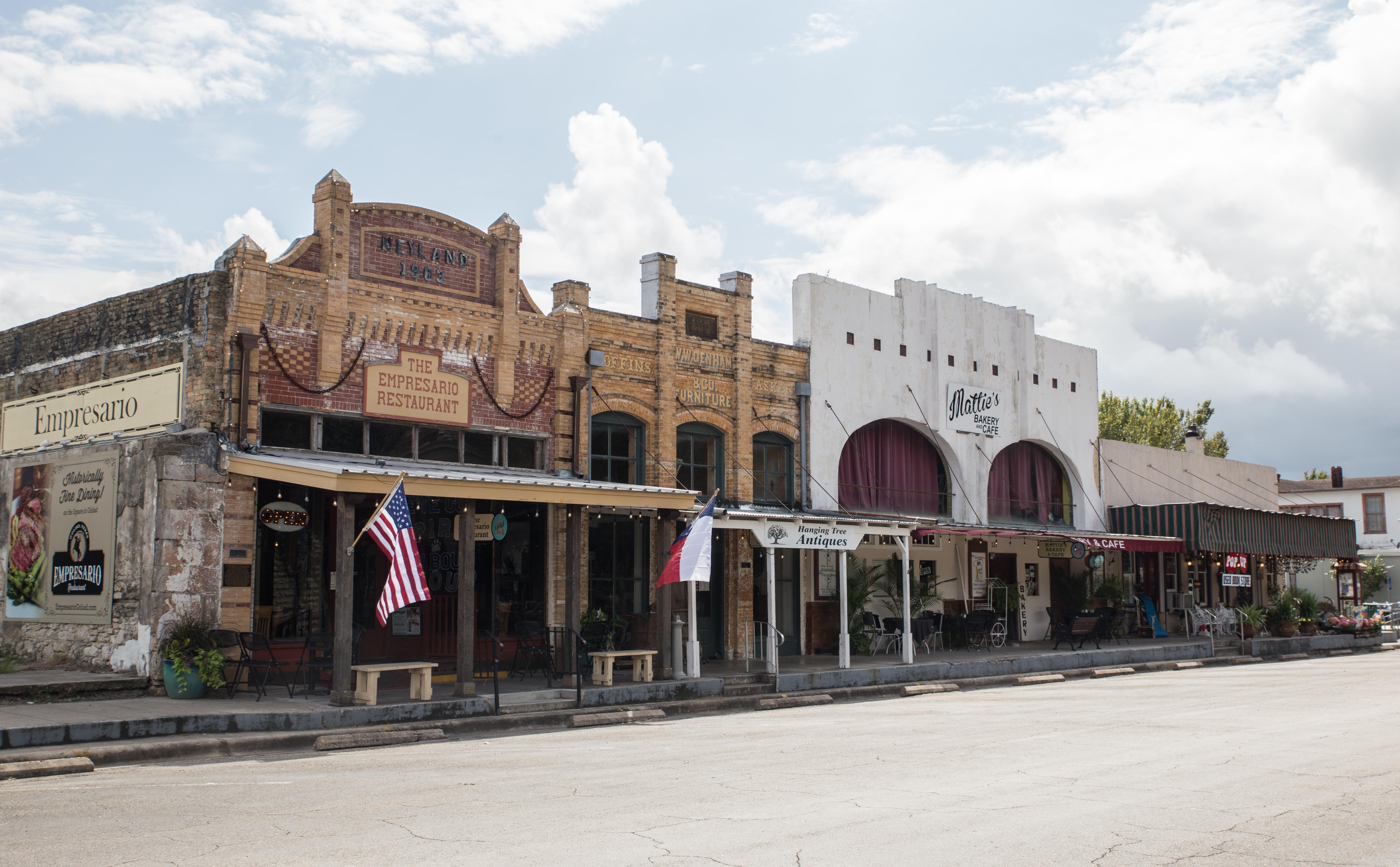
Downtown Goliad, Texas

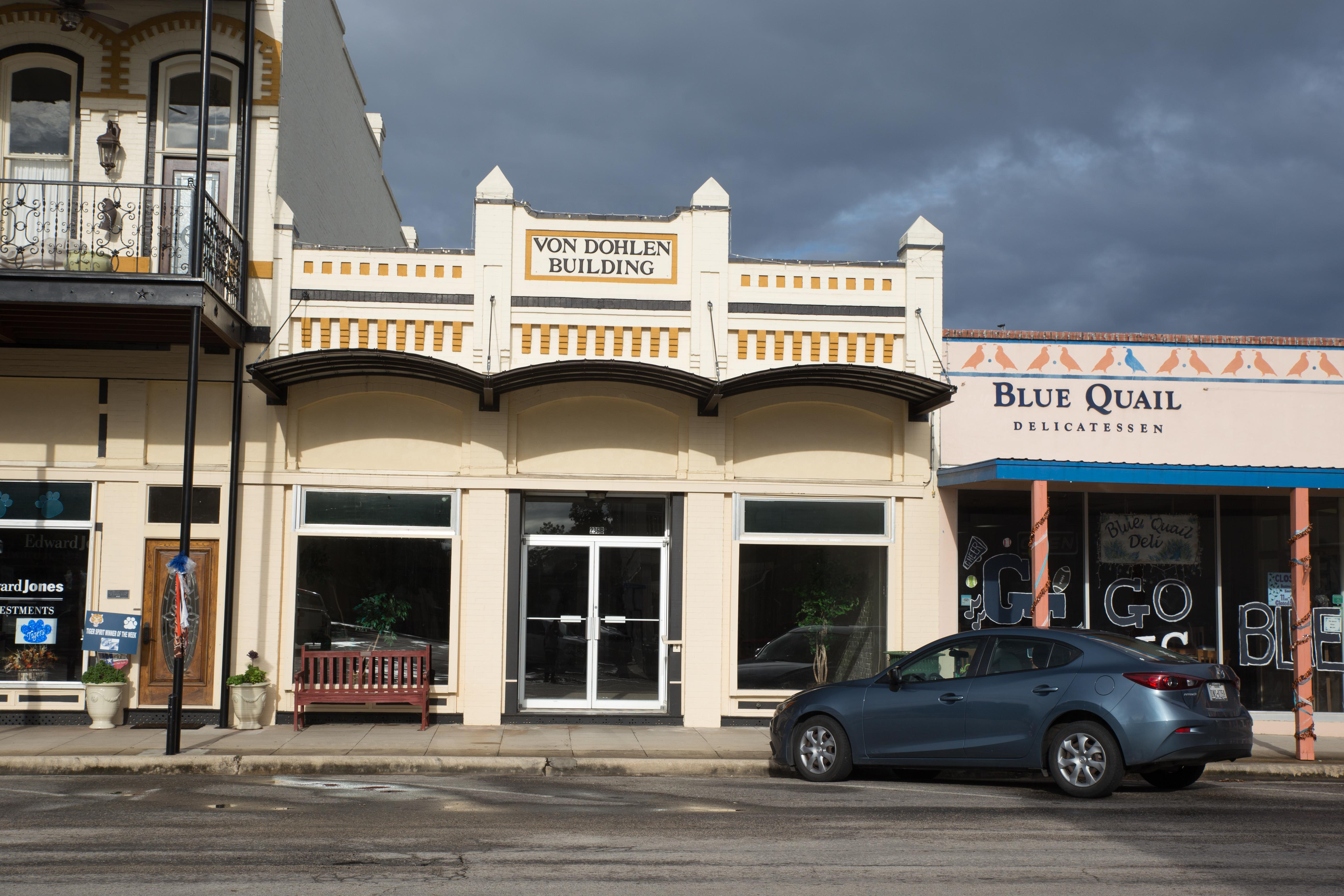
Von Dohlen Building

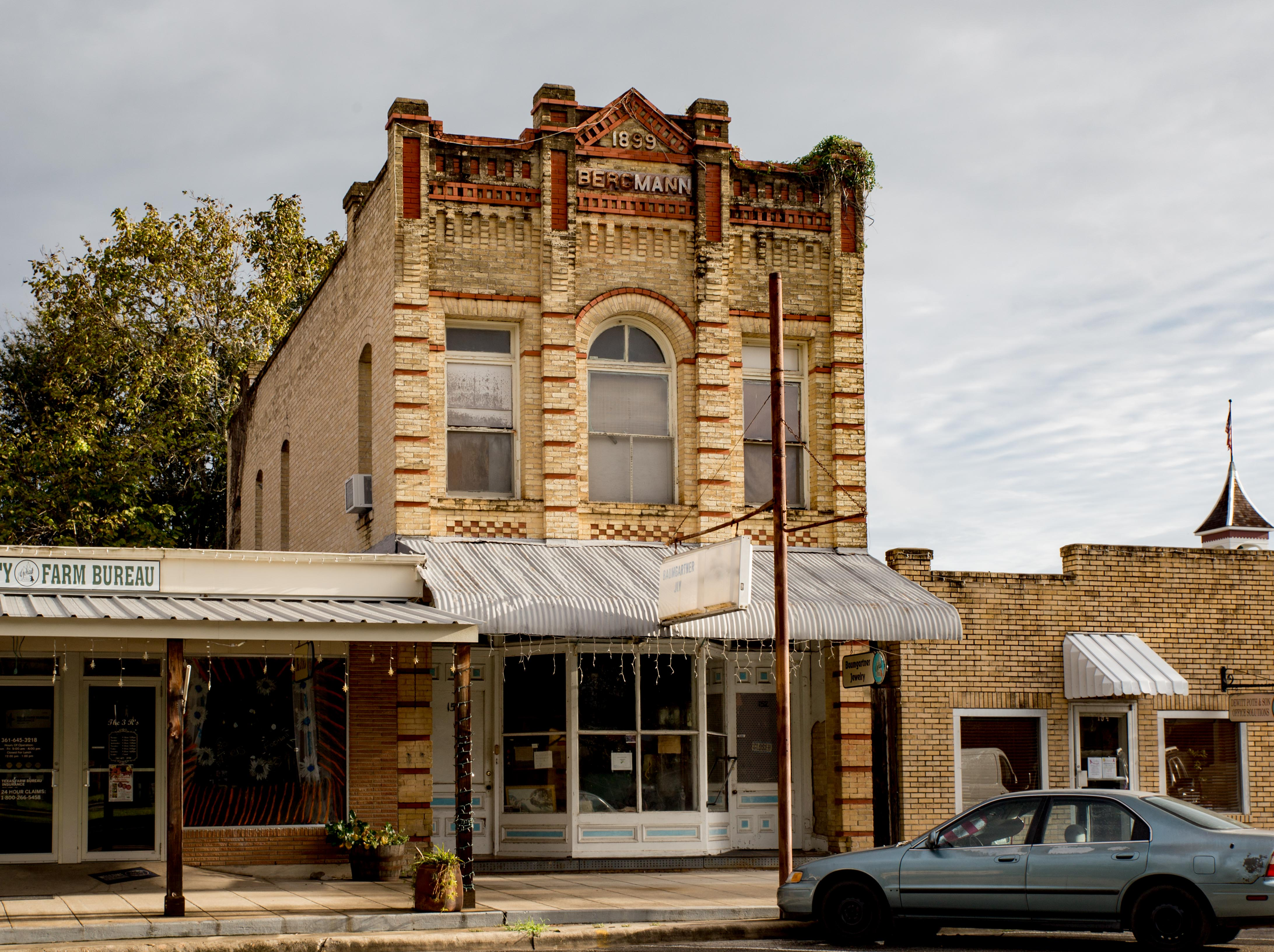
Bergmann Building

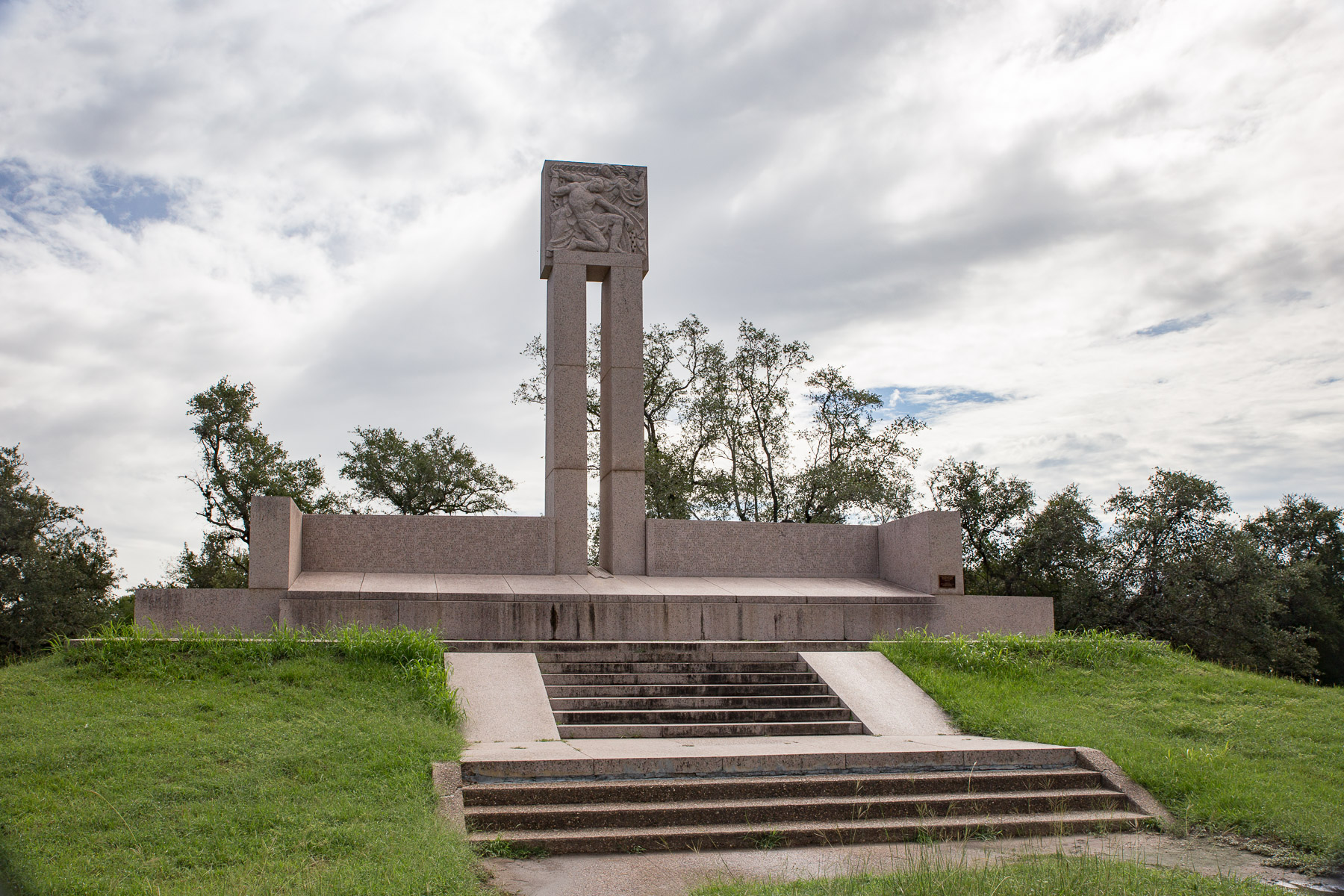
Goliad Massacre Monument

== Climate ==
The climate in this area is characterized by hot, humid summers and generally mild to cool winters. According to the Köppen climate classification, Goliad has a humid subtropical climate, Cfa on climate maps.

== See also ==
- List of geographic names derived from anagrams and ananyms
