= Goliad County, Texas =

County in Texas, United States

- County
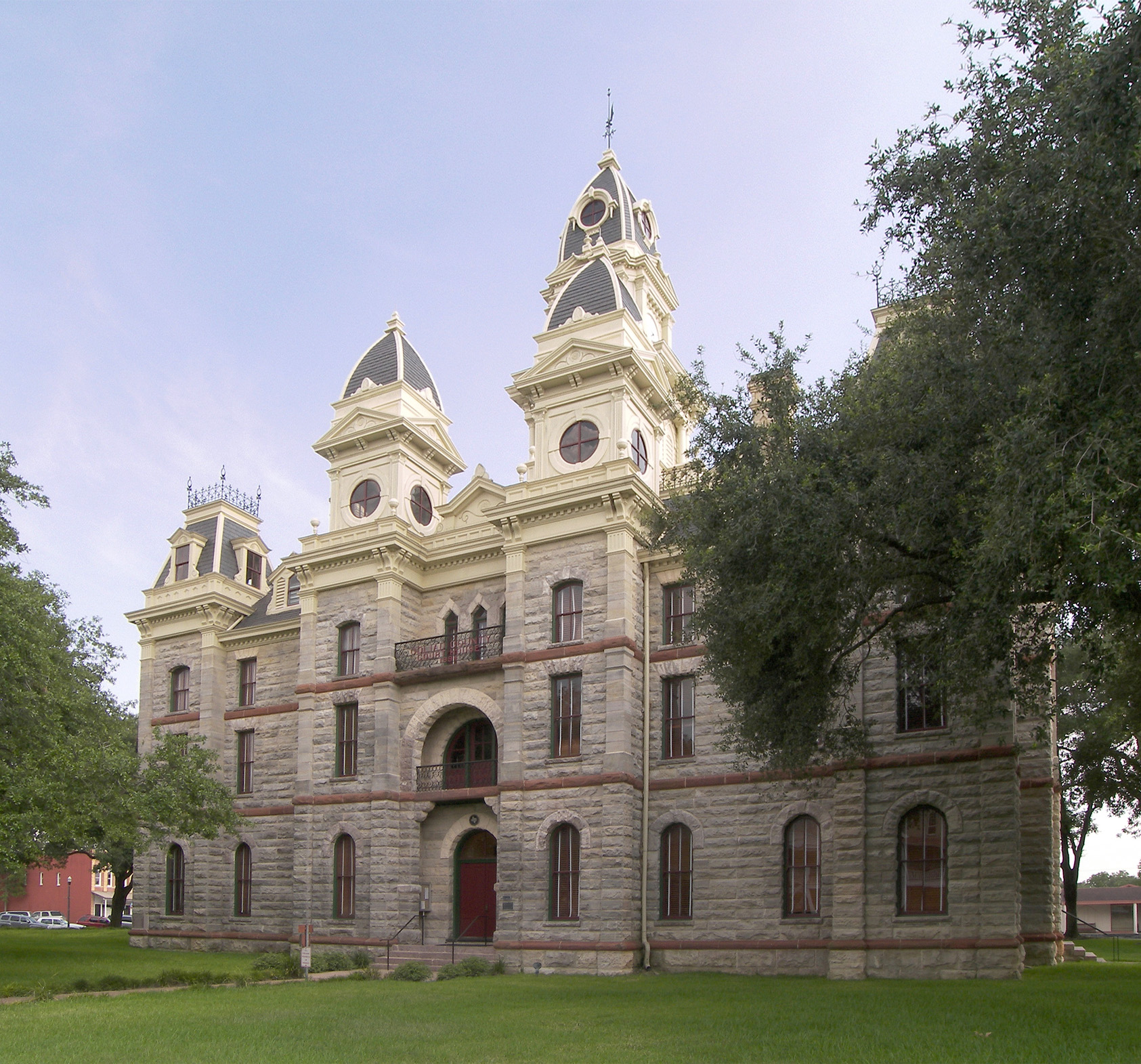
- The Goliad County Courthouse in Goliad: The courthouse and the surrounding square were added to the National Register of Historic Places on June 29, 1976.

- Location within the U.S. state of Texas
- Coordinates: 28°39′N 97°26′W
- Country: United States
- State: Texas
- Founded: 1837
- Named for: Miguel Hidalgo
- Seat: Goliad
- Largest city: Goliad

Area
  - Total: 859 sq mi (2,220 km^{2})
  - Land: 852 sq mi (2,210 km^{2})
  - Water: 7.4 sq mi (19 km^{2}) 0.9%

Population (2020)
  - Total: 7,012
  - Estimate (2025): 7,208 ▲
  - Density: 8.23/sq mi (3.18/km^{2})
- Time zone: UTC−6 (Central)
  - Summer (DST): UTC−5 (CDT)
- Congressional district: 27th
- Website: www.co.goliad.tx.us

Goliad County (/ˈɡoʊliæd/ GOH-lee-ad) is a county located in the U.S. state of Texas. As of the 2020 census, its population was 7,012. Its county seat is Goliad. The county is named for Father Miguel Hidalgo; "Goliad" is an anagram, minus the silent H. The county was created in 1836 and organized the next year. Goliad County is a part of the Victoria metropolitan area.

== History ==
Pajalat and Siquipil, both Coahuiltecan peoples, were indigenous peoples who lived in what became Goliad County. A 1727 Spanish map records them living in the area.

The first declaration of independence for the Republic of Texas was signed in Goliad on December 20, 1835, although the formal declaration was made by the Convention of 1836 at Washington-on-the-Brazos. Goliad County was the site of two battles in the Texas Revolution. The Battle of Goliad was a minor skirmish early in the war, and the subsequent battle of Coleto was an important battle that culminated on March 27, 1836. Col. James Fannin and his Texan soldiers were executed by the Mexican army, under orders from Gen. Antonio López de Santa Anna, in what became known as the Goliad Massacre. This event led to the Texas Revolutionary battle cry "Remember the Alamo! Remember Goliad!" Although many remember the Alamo today, fewer remember Goliad. The site of the massacre is located near Presidio la Bahia, just south of the town of Goliad.

In 1874, Juan Moya, a prominent Tejano landowner and Mexican army captain who fought in the Texas Revolution, was lynched, along with his two sons, by a mob who suspected them of murdering a neighboring family in Goliad County.

Goliad County is also the birthplace of General Ignacio Zaragoza, who led the Mexican army against the invading forces of Napoleon III in the Battle of Puebla on May 5, 1862 ("Cinco de Mayo").

== Geography ==
According to the U.S. Census Bureau, the county has a total area of 859 square miles (2,220 km^{2}), of which 7.4 sq mi (19 km^{2}) (0.9%) are covered by water.

=== Major highways ===
- U.S. Highway 59
  - Interstate 69W is currently under construction and will follow the current route of U.S. 59 in most places.
- U.S. Highway 77 Alternate/U.S. Highway 183
- State Highway 119
- State Highway 239
- Loop 71
- Farm to Market Road 81
- Farm to Market Road 622
- Farm to Market Road 883

=== Adjacent counties ===
- DeWitt County (north)
- Victoria County (northeast)
- Refugio County (southeast)
- Bee County (southwest)
- Karnes County (northwest)

== Demographics ==
Historical population
Census	Pop.	Note	%±
1850	648		—
1860	3,384		422.2%
1870	3,628		7.2%
1880	5,832		60.7%
1890	5,910		1.3%
1900	8,310		40.6%
1910	9,909		19.2%
1920	9,348		−5.7%
1930	10,093		8.0%
1940	8,798		−12.8%
1950	6,219		−29.3%
1960	5,429		−12.7%
1970	4,869		−10.3%
1980	5,193		6.7%
1990	5,980		15.2%
2000	6,928		15.9%
2010	7,210		4.1%
2020	7,012		−2.7%
2025 (est.)	7,208	▲	2.8%
U.S. Decennial Census; 1850–2010 2020

=== Racial and ethnic composition ===
Goliad County, Texas – Racial and ethnic composition Note: the US Census treats Hispanic/Latino as an ethnic category. This table excludes Latinos from the racial categories and assigns them to a separate category. Hispanics/Latinos may be of any race.
Race / Ethnicity (NH = Non-Hispanic)	Pop 1980	Pop 1990	Pop 2000	Pop 2010	Pop 2020	% 1980	% 1990	% 2000	% 2010	% 2020
White alone (NH)	2,864	3,420	4,115	4,337	4,246	55.15%	57.19%	59.40%	60.15%	60.55%
Black or African American alone (NH)	462	387	317	310	235	8.90%	6.47%	4.58%	4.30%	3.35%
Native American or Alaska Native alone (NH)	4	12	9	29	18	0.08%	0.20%	0.13%	0.40%	0.26%
Asian alone (NH)	4	5	14	11	24	0.08%	0.08%	0.20%	0.15%	0.34%
Native Hawaiian or Pacific Islander alone (NH)	x	x	1	0	0	x	x	0.01%	0.00%	0.00%
Other race alone (NH)	10	11	0	6	16	0.19%	0.18%	0.00%	0.08%	0.23%
Mixed race or Multiracial (NH)	x	x	33	55	185	x	x	0.48%	0.76%	2.64%
Hispanic or Latino (any race)	1,849	2,145	2,439	2,462	2,288	35.61%	35.87%	35.20%	34.15%	32.63%
Total	5,193	5,980	6,928	7,210	7,012	100.00%	100.00%	100.00%	100.00%	100.00%

=== 2020 census ===
As of the 2020 census, the county had a population of 7,012. The median age was 46.5 years, 21.6% of residents were under 18, and 23.3% were 65 years of age or older. For every 100 females there were 97.7 males, and for every 100 females age 18 and over there were 96.1 males age 18 and over.

The racial makeup of the county was 73.1% White, 3.9% Black or African American, 0.4% American Indian and Alaska Native, 0.4% Asian, <0.1% Native Hawaiian and Pacific Islander, 7.5% from some other race, and 14.6% from two or more races. Hispanic or Latino residents of any race comprised 32.6% of the population.

<0.1% of residents lived in urban areas, while 100.0% lived in rural areas.

There were 2,815 households in the county, of which 30.4% had children under the age of 18 living in them. Of all households, 55.0% were married-couple households, 17.2% were households with a male householder and no spouse or partner present, and 23.4% were households with a female householder and no spouse or partner present. About 24.7% of all households were made up of individuals and 13.5% had someone living alone who was 65 years of age or older.

There were 3,503 housing units, of which 19.6% were vacant. Among occupied housing units, 80.7% were owner-occupied and 19.3% were renter-occupied. The homeowner vacancy rate was 2.1% and the rental vacancy rate was 8.7%.

=== 2000 census ===
As of the 2000 census, 6,928 people, 2,644 households, and 1,975 families resided in the county. The population density was 8 people per square mile (3.1 people/km^{2}). The 3,426 housing units had an average density of 4 units per square mile (1.5/km^{2}). The racial makeup of the county was 82.62% White, 4.82% Black or African American, 0.55% Native American, 0.22% Asian, 10.06% from other races, and 1.73% from two or more races. About 35.20% of the population were Hispanics or Latinos of any race.

Of the 2,644 households, 33.1% had children under 18 living with them, 62.1% were married couples living together, 8.7 had a female householder with no husband present, and 25.3% were not families. About 22.8% of all households were made up of individuals, and 11.9% had someone living alone who was 65 or older. The average household size was 2.57 and the average family size was 3.02.

In the county, the age distribution was 25.9% under 18, 6.5% from 18 to 24, 25.0% from 25 to 44, 25.2% from 45 to 64, and 17.5% who were 65 or older. The median age was 40 years. For every 100 females, there were 98.9 males. For every 100 females 18 and over, there were 94.1 males.

The median income for a household in the county was $34,201, and for a family was $40,446. Males had a median income of $30,954 versus $20,028 for females. The per capita income for the county was $17,126. About 11.9% of families and 16.4% of the population were below the poverty line, including 25.7% of those under 18 and 11.1% of those 65 or over.

== Education ==
Goliad County is served by the Goliad Independent School District.

== Communities ==
=== City ===
- Goliad (county seat)

=== Unincorporated communities ===
- Angel City
- Berclair
- Fannin
- Weesatche

== Politics ==
United States presidential election results for Goliad County, Texas
Year	Republican		Democratic		Third party(ies)	
Year	No.	%	No.	%	No.	%
1912	425	39.57%	500	46.55%	149	13.87%
1916	548	45.03%	605	49.71%	64	5.26%
1920	513	44.11%	448	38.52%	202	17.37%
1924	438	32.86%	733	54.99%	162	12.15%
1928	554	54.10%	468	45.70%	2	0.20%
1932	170	9.90%	1,542	89.76%	6	0.35%
1936	323	21.38%	1,184	78.36%	4	0.26%
1940	580	39.92%	868	59.74%	5	0.34%
1944	609	45.18%	641	47.55%	98	7.27%
1948	450	43.48%	454	43.86%	131	12.66%
1952	1,065	70.16%	452	29.78%	1	0.07%
1956	902	72.33%	338	27.11%	7	0.56%
1960	741	50.93%	711	48.87%	3	0.21%
1964	549	35.63%	990	64.24%	2	0.13%
1968	707	45.52%	690	44.43%	156	10.05%
1972	1,018	68.60%	464	31.27%	2	0.13%
1976	846	48.87%	875	50.55%	10	0.58%
1980	1,170	51.16%	1,081	47.27%	36	1.57%
1984	1,540	64.79%	836	35.17%	1	0.04%
1988	1,427	51.11%	1,358	48.64%	7	0.25%
1992	1,236	43.66%	1,069	37.76%	526	18.58%
1996	1,335	50.66%	1,135	43.07%	165	6.26%
2000	2,108	62.15%	1,233	36.35%	51	1.50%
2004	2,267	64.75%	1,219	34.82%	15	0.43%
2008	2,298	62.87%	1,329	36.36%	28	0.77%
2012	2,294	66.34%	1,127	32.59%	37	1.07%
2016	2,620	70.66%	973	26.24%	115	3.10%
2020	3,085	77.22%	877	21.95%	33	0.83%
2024	3,178	79.71%	778	19.51%	31	0.78%

United States Senate election results for Goliad County, Texas1
Year	Republican		Democratic		Third party(ies)	
Year	No.	%	No.	%	No.	%
2024	3,016	76.51%	853	21.64%	73	1.85%

United States Senate election results for Goliad County, Texas2
Year	Republican		Democratic		Third party(ies)	
Year	No.	%	No.	%	No.	%
2020	3,000	76.75%	840	21.49%	69	1.77%

Texas Gubernatorial election results for Goliad County
Year	Republican		Democratic		Third party(ies)	
Year	No.	%	No.	%	No.	%
2022	2,664	79.14%	663	19.70%	39	1.16%

== See also ==
- List of museums in South Texas
- National Register of Historic Places listings in Goliad County, Texas
- Recorded Texas Historic Landmarks in Goliad County
- Texas Cart War
