= List of museums in South Texas =

This article was split from List of museums in Texas.

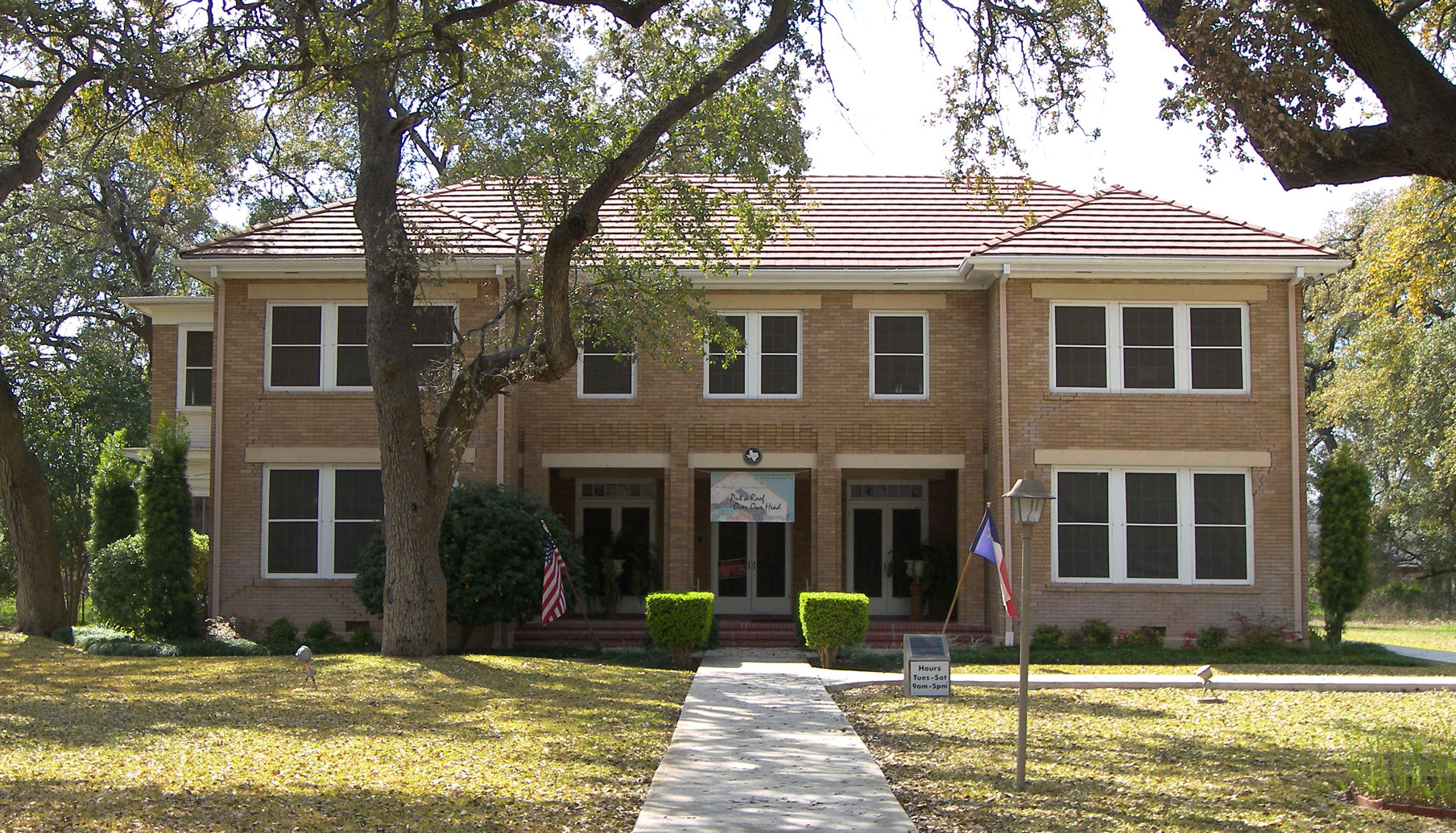
Briscoe-Garner Museum

The list of museums in South Texas encompasses museums defined for this context as institutions (including nonprofit organizations, government entities, and private businesses) that collect and care for objects of cultural, artistic, scientific, or historical interest and make their collections or related exhibits available for public viewing. Museums that exist only in cyberspace (i.e., virtual museums) are not included. Also included are non-profit art galleries and exhibit spaces.

== South Texas ==
South Texas is a region of the US state of Texas that lies roughly south of and including San Antonio. The southern and western boundary is the Rio Grande, and to the east it is the Gulf of Mexico.

Counties included are Aransas, Atascosa, Bee, Brooks, Calhoun, Cameron, DeWitt, Dimmit, Duval, Edwards, Frio, Goliad, Gonzales, Guadalupe, Hidalgo, Jackson, Jim Hogg, Jim Wells, Karnes, Kenedy, Kinney, Kleberg, La Salle, Lavaca, Live Oak, Maverick, McMullen, Medina, Nueces, Real, Refugio, San Patricio, Starr, Uvalde, Val Verde, Victoria, Webb, Willacy, Zapata, Zavala County, Texas.

== Museums ==
=== Aransas - Brooks ===
List of museums in the Aransas - Brooks counties
Museum name	Image	City	County	Notes	Refs
Bay Education Center		Rockport	Aransas	Ecology of the Mission-Aransas National Estuarine Research Reserve	
Fulton Mansion State Historic Site		Rockport	Aransas	Recorded Texas Historic Landmark, National Register of Historic Place	
History Center for Aransas County		Rockport	Aransas		
Rockport Center for the Arts		Rockport	Aransas	All varieties of the arts	
Texas Maritime Museum		Rockport	Aransas		
Longhorn Museum		Pleasanton	Atascosa		
Beeville Art Museum		Beeville	Bee		
McClanahan House		Beeville	Bee	Oldest business structure in Beeville	
Skidmore Historical Society Museum	Skidmore Historical Society Museum	Skidmore	Bee		
The Heritage Museum at Falfurias		Falfurrias	Brooks County		

=== Calhoun - Cameron ===
List of museums in the Calhoun - Cameron counties
Museum name	Image	City	County	Notes	Refs
Calhoun County Museum		Port Lavaca	Calhoun		
Brownsville Heritage Museum/Stillman House Museum		Brownsville	Cameron	Recorded Texas Historic Landmark, National Register of Historic Places	
Children's Museum of Brownsville		Brownsville	Cameron		
Commemorative Air Force Rio Grande Valley Wing Museum		Brownsville	Cameron	World War II history, vehicles and aircraft, branch of the Commemorative Air Force	
Costumes of America		Brownsville	Cameron		
Freddy Fender Museum		San Benito	Cameron		
The Harlingen Arts and Heritage Museum		Harlingen	Cameron		
Historic Brownsville Museum		Brownsville	Cameron	Recorded Texas Historic Landmark, National Register of Historic Places	
Iwo Jima Museum		Harlingen	Cameron		
Market Square Research Center		Brownsville	Cameron		
Palo Alto Battlefield National Historical Park		Brownsville	Cameron		
Port Isabel Lighthouse	[Port Isabel Lighthouse	Port Isabel, Texas	Cameron	National Register of Historic Places	
Port Isabel Historical Museum		Port Isabel	Cameron		
San Benito Cultural Heritage Museum		San Benito	Cameron		
San Benito History Museum		San Benito	Cameron		
Texas Conjunto Music Hall of Fame and Museum		San Benito	Cameron		
Treasures of the Gulf Museum		Port Isabel	Cameron	Children's Discovery Lab	

=== DeWitt - Frio ===
List of museums in the DeWitt - Frio counties
Museum name	Image	City	County	Notes	Refs
Chisholm Trail Heritage Museum		Cuero	DeWitt	Recorded Texas Historic Landmark	
Cuero Heritage Museum		Cuero	DeWitt	National Register of Historic Places	
DeWitt County Historical Museum		Cuero	DeWitt	Recorded Texas Historic Landmark, National Register of Historic Places	
Pharmacy and Medical Museum of Texas		Cuero	DeWitt	Established by Joseph Reuss in 1845	
Yoakum Heritage Museum		Yoakum	DeWitt		
Dimmit County Visitor Center and Jailhouse Museum		Carrizo Springs	Dimmit		
Wade House Memorial Museum		Carrizo Springs	Dimmit		
Duval County Historical Museum		San Diego	Duval	Local history	
Frio Pioneer Jail Museum		Pearsal	Frio County	Built in 1884	

=== Goliad - Guadalupe ===
List of museums in the Goliad - Guadalupe counties
Museum name	Image	City	County	Notes	Refs
Berclair Mansion		Berclair	Goliad	Operated by the Beeville Art Association, 1930s mansion with art and antiques from around the world	
Fannin Battleground State Historic Site		Fannin	Goliad	Recorded Texas Historic Landmark	
Goliad State Park and Historic Site	Former custodian's house for Goliad State Park	Goliad	Goliad	Recorded Texas Historic Landmark, National Register of Historic Places	
J. A. White Family Goliad Center for Texas History		Goliad	Goliad		
Market House Museum		Goliad	Goliad	Recorded Texas Historic Landmark, National Register of Historic Places	
Presidio La Bahía	Presidio La Bahía	Goliad	Goliad	National Register of Historic Places	
Zaragoza Birthplace State Historic Site	Zaragoza Birthplace State Historic Site	Goliad	Goliad	State Antiquities Landmark	
Eggleston House		Gonzales	Gonzales	1840s period dog-run style cabin	
Gonzales County Jail Museum		Gonzales	Gonzales	Recorded Texas Historic Landmark, National Register of Historic Places	
Gonzales Memorial Museum		Gonzales	Gonzales		
Gonzales Pioneer Village Living History Center		Gonzales	Gonzales	10 historic structures	
J.B. Wells House Museum		Gonzales	Gonzales		
Pioneer Flight Museum		Kingsbury	Guadalupe		
Los Nogales	Los Nogales	Seguin	Guadalupe	1849 adobe house, National Register Listing	
Pape's Nutcracker Museum		Seguin	Guadalupe	Nutcrackers, bowls, and other items	
Sebastopol House Historic Site		Seguin	Guadalupe	National Register Listing,	
Seguin Guadalupe County Heritage Museum		Seguin	Guadalupe		
Texas Agricultural Education and Heritage Center		Seguin	Guadalupe	blacksmith shop, smoke house, one-room schoolhouse and general store	
Wilson Pottery Museum		Seguin	Guadalupe	Recorded Texas Historic Landmark, National Register of Historic Places. Museum is inside Sebastopol House Historic Site.	

=== Hidalgo ===
List of museums in the Hidalgo County
Museum name	Image	City	County	Notes	Refs
City of Alamo Museum		Alamo	Hidalgo		
Donna Hooks Fletcher Historical Museum		Donna	Hidalgo		
Gelman Stained Glass Museum		San Juan	Hidalgo		
International Museum of Art & Science (IMAS)		McAllen	Hidalgo	Art & science museum	
McAllen Heritage Center		McAllen	Hidalgo		
Mission Historical Museum		Mission	Hidalgo		
Museum of South Texas History		Edinburg	Hidalgo	Recorded Texas Historic Landmark	
Old Hidalgo Pumphouse Museum and World Birding Center		Hidalgo	Hidalgo	One of the World Birding Center sites	
Smitty's Juke Box Museum		Pharr	Hidalgo	From the collection of Leo “Smitty” Schmitt and family	
Southern Pacific Railroad Depot		Edinburg	Hidalgo		
Weslaco Museum		Weslaco	Hidalgo	Area history from 18th-century Spanish colonial ranching to present da	

=== Jackson - Kleberg ===
List of museums in the Jackson - Kleberg counties
Museum name	Image	City	County	Notes	Refs
Texana Museum		Edna	Jackson	Local history	
Franciscan Museum of Hebbronville		Hebbronville	Jim Hogg	Located in the old Jim Hogg County Jail	
Museum Foundation of Hebbronville		Hebbronville	Jim Hogg		
Orange Grove Area Museum		Orange Grove	Jim Wells	Non-profit teaching museum	
South Texas Museum		Alice	Jim Wells	Recorded Texas Historic Landmark	
Tejano R.O.O.T.S. Hall of Fame		Alice	Jim Wells	Tejano music	
Third Coast Squadron Commemorative Air Force Museum		Alice	Jim Wells	History of the 3rd Coast Squadron of the Commemorative Air Force	
Karnes County Museum		Helena	Karnes	Ghost town operated by the Karnes County Historical Society	
Polish Heritage Center at Panna Maria		Panna Maria	Karnes	Promotes the history, culture, and traditions of the first permanent Polish settlement in the United States	
St. Joseph School Museum		Panna Maria	Karnes	Late 19th-century private Polish school, exhibits of early Polish settlers, artifacts used in the church, family photos	
Kenedy Ranch Museum of South Texas		Sarita	Kenedy	History of Mifflin Kenedy and the Kenedy family and the economic development of South Texas in ranching, railroads, land development and oil	
Old Fort Clark Guardhouse Museum		Brackettville	Kinney	Fort history, local and pioneer history exhibits, displays from several African American military units, including the Black Seminole Scouts and the Buffalo Soldiers of the 24th and 25th U.S. Infantry	
Kinney County Heritage Museum		Brackettville	Kinney	Operated by the Kinney County Historical Commission	
1904 Train Depot Museum		Kingsville	Kleberg	Recorded Texas Historic Landmark	
John E. Conner Museum		Kingsville	Kleberg	Part of Texas A&M University–Kingsville, natural and cultural history of South	
King Ranch Museum		Kingsville	Kleberg	History of the King Ranch	
South Texas Archives		Kingsville	Kleberg	Affiliated with the James C. Jernigan Library of Texas A&M University-Kingsville	

=== La Salle - Medina ===
List of museums in the La Salle - Medina counties
Museum name	Image	City	County	Notes	Refs
Brush Country Museum		Cotulla	La Salle	Operated by the La Salle County Historical Commission	
City of Shiner Edwin Wolters Memorial Museum		Shiner	Lavaca	Recorded Texas Historic Landmark	
Lavaca Historical Museum		Hallettsville	Lavaca		
Grace Armantrout Museum		George West	Live Oak	Local historical interest	
Fort Duncan Museum		Eagle Pass	Maverick	National Register of Historic Places Listing	
McMullen County Historical Museum		Tilden	McMullen	Everything is archived but available by appointment	
Landmark Inn State Historic Site	Landmark Inn State Historic Site	Castroville	Medina	State Antiquities Landmark, National Register of Historic Places Listing	
Medina County Museum		Hondo	Medina		
Shooting Star Museum		Devine	Medina	Vintage aircraft, historical aviation items, antique automobiles and early 20th century farming equipment and gasoline engines	
Steinbach Haus Visitor Center		Castroville	Medina	A 1998 gift to Castroville from Alsace, France, Das Haus Aus Elsass (the House from Alsace), was built in France in the 1600s.	

=== Nueces - Starr ===
List of museums in the Nueces - Starr counties
Museum name	Image	City	County	Notes	Refs
Art Center of Corpus Christi		Corpus Christi	Nueces	Community art center with exhibit galleries	
Art Museum of South Texas	Art Museum of South Texas	Corpus Christi	Nueces	Variety of American styles	
Britton-Evans Centennial House		Corpus Christi	Nueces	Built in 1849 by shipping magnate Forbes Britton, who served in the Texas State Legislature 1857-1861	
Corpus Christi Museum of Science & History		Corpus Christi	Nueces	40,000 square feet of exhibits	
Heritage Park		Corpus Christi	Nueces	Historic Corpus Christi homes	
K Space Contemporary		Corpus Christi	Nueces	Rotating art exhibitions	
Selena Museum		Corpus Christi	Nueces	Music star Selena Quintanilla-Pérez	
Port Aransas Museum		Port Aransas	Nueces	Memorabilia and artifacts	
Tejano Civil Rights Museum		Corpus Christi	Nueces		
Texas State Museum of Asian Cultures and Education Center		Corpus Christi	Nueces		
Texas Surf Museum and South Texas Music Walk of Fame		Corpus Christi	Nueces		
USS Lexington		Corpus Christi	Nueces	"The Blue Ghost", an Essex-class aircraft carrier built during World War II for the United States Navy	
Real County Historical Museum		Leakey	Real	Log cabin, horse-drawn hearse, nearby blacksmith shop	
Refugio County Museum		Refugio	Refugio	Local history	
Blackland Museum		Taft	San Patricio	Local history	
Sinton Texas Historical Museum		Sinton	San Patricio	Historical artifacts	
Kelsey Bass Museum		Rio Grande City	Starr		

=== Uvalde - Victoria ===
List of museums in the Uvalde - Victoria counties
Museum name	Image	City	County	Notes	Refs
Aviation Museum at Garner Field		Uvalde	Uvalde	Military and civilian aircraft	
Briscoe Art and Antique Collection		Uvalde	Uvalde	Collection of Governor and Mrs. Dolph Briscoe	
Briscoe-Garner Museum		Uvalde	Uvalde	Located in the John Nance Garner House. Recorded Texas Historic Landmark, National Register of Historic Places	
El Progreso Memorial Library and Weisman Museum of Southwest Texas		Uvalde	Uvalde		
Laughlin Heritage Foundation Museum		Del Rio	Val Verde	History of Laughlin Air Force Base	
Seminole Canyon State Park and Historic Site	Seminole Canyon State Park and Historic Site	Comstock	Val Verde	National Register of Historic Places. Interpretive center about the park's Native American pictographs, cave dwellings and history	
Judge Roy Bean Visitor Center		Langtry	Val Verde	Recorded Texas Historic Landmark	
Whitehead Memorial Museum	Settlers cabin	Del Rio	Val Verde	Recorded Texas Historic Landmark	
Children's Discovery Museum of the Golden Crescent		Victoria	Victoria	Children	
Five Points Museum of Contemporary Art		Victoria	Victoria	Contemporary Art	
Museum of the Coastal Bend		Victoria	Victoria	Located on the Victoria College campus. Heritage of Texas' mid-coastal region	
Nave Museum	Royston Nave Memorial	Victoria	Victoria	Works by architect Atlee Ayers, as well as other exhibits	

=== Webb - Zapata ===
List of museums in the Webb - Zapata counties
Museum name	Image	City	County	Notes	Refs
Casa Ortiz		Laredo	Webb	Recorded Texas Historic Landmark	
Imaginarium of South Texas		Laredo	Webb	Children's museum	
Laredo Center for the Arts		Laredo	Webb	Located in Market Square	
Rio Grande Republic Capitol Building	Rio Grande Republic Capitol Building	Laredo	Webb	Recorded Texas Historic Landmark, National Register of Historic Places	
Texas A&M International University Art Gallery		Laredo	Webb		
Villa Antigua Border Heritage Museum		Laredo	Webb	Part of the San Agustín Historic District	
Washington's Birthday Celebration Museum		Laredo	Webb	For two weeks every February. Celebrates the birthday of America's first president with parades, fiewoorks and festivities	
Willacy County Historical Museum		Raymondville	Willacy	Located in the old Raymondville High School	
Mertens Frontier Ranch Store and Museum		Zapata	Zapata	Eclectic collection on the road to the Falcones Reservoir	
Zapata County Museum of History		Zapata	Zapata	Local history and artifacts	

== Defunct museums ==
- Alamo Village, Brackettville, movie and television shooting location, includes John Wayne Western Museum, closed in 2010
- Cool Cats Toy Museum, Corpus Christi

== See also ==
- List of museums in Texas
- List of museums in East Texas
- List of museums in the Texas Gulf Coast
- List of museums in North Texas
- List of museums in the Texas Panhandle
- List of museums in Central Texas
- List of museums in West Texas

== Resources ==
- Texas Association of Museums
- Texas Association of Museums (Archived)
- Historic House Museums in Texas
