= List of Texas Revolution monuments and memorials =

This is a list of monuments and memorials that were established as public displays and symbols of the Texas Revolution of 1835-1836 and its veterans.

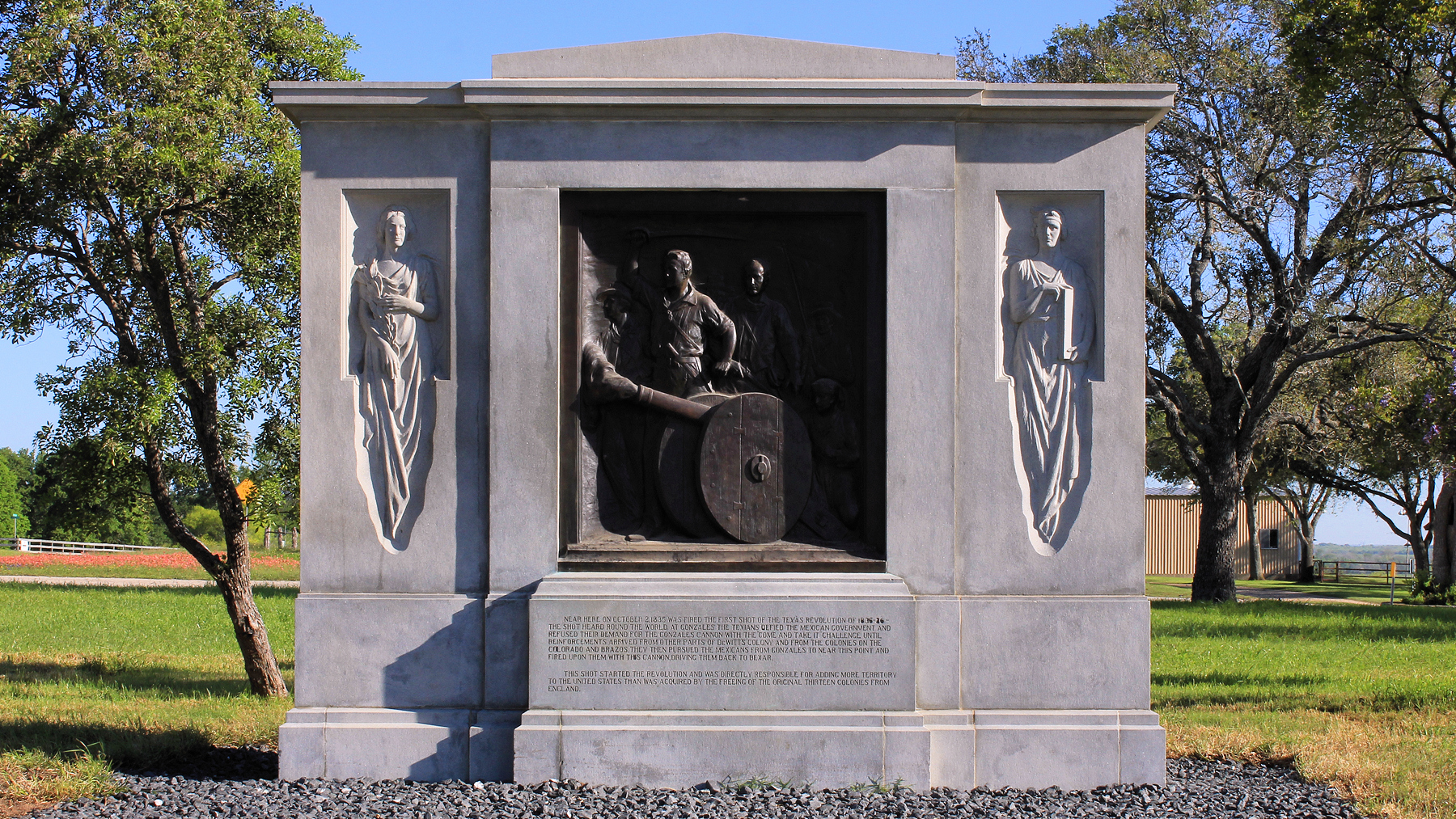
The First Shot of the Texas Revolution Monument.

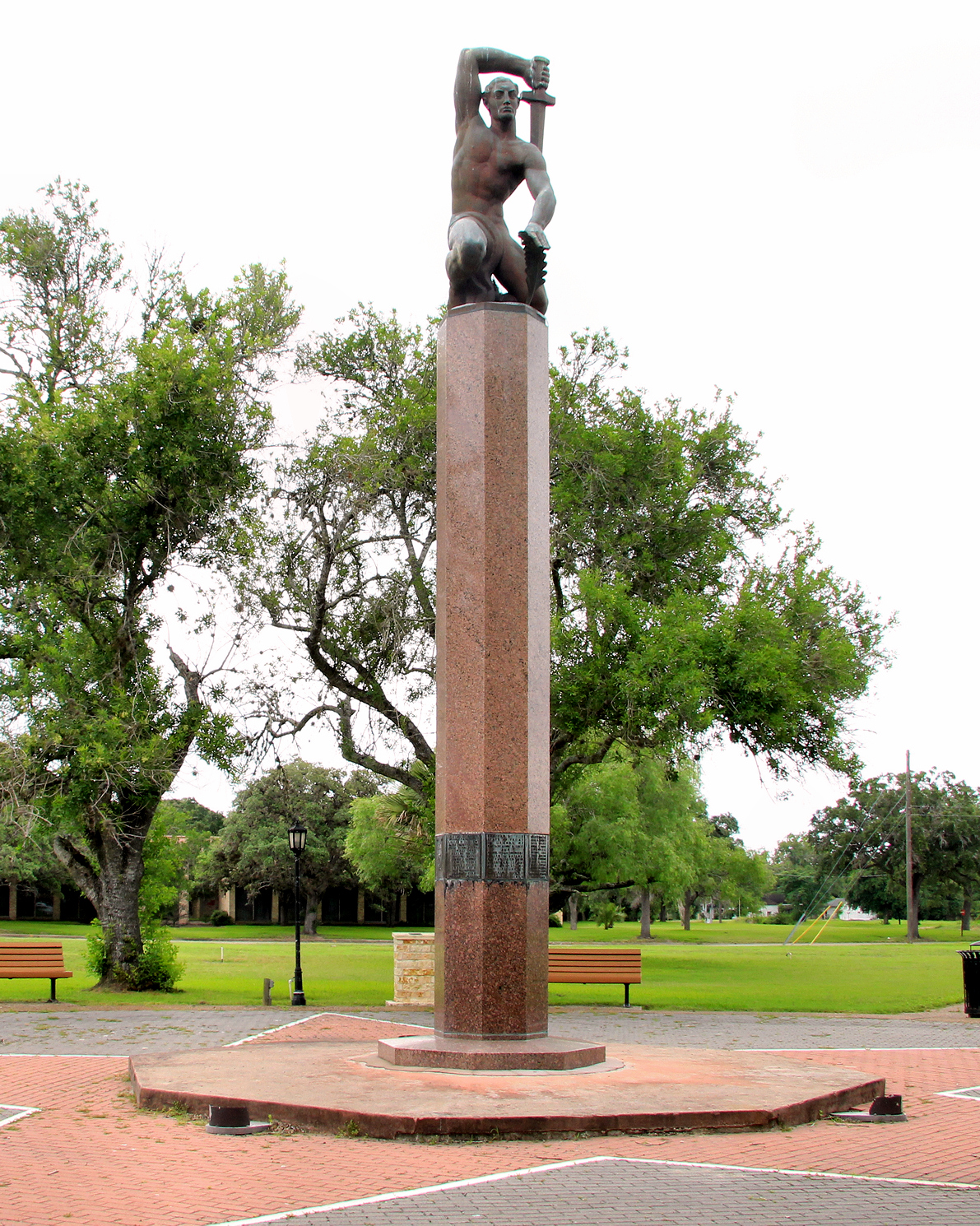
The Monument to Amon B. King and His Men.

== Texas ==
- San Jacinto Monument, 1939. "a 567.31-foot-high (172.92-meter) column located on the Houston Ship Channel in unincorporated Harris County, Texas, United States, near the city of Houston. The monument is topped with a 220-ton star that commemorates the site of the Battle of San Jacinto, the decisive battle of the Texas ..."
- First Shot of the Texas Revolution Monument, 1936. Cost, Texas
- Alamo Cenotaph, 1940. San Antonio, Texas
- Heroes of the Alamo Monument, 1891. Texas State Capitol grounds, Austin, Texas. Designer: J.S. Clark, Sculptor: Crohl Smith.
- The Alamo, San Antonio, Texas
- "Angel of Goliad" statue, depicting Francisca Alvarez, dedicated March 2004
- Monument to Texas Revolution Georgia Battalion Volunteers, Albany, Texas.
- Texas Heroes Monument, unveiled April 21, 1900. Galveston, Texas
- "Come and Take it Monument", 1910. Gonzales, Texas
- "The Immortal 32", 1936. monument to 32 men from Gonzales who died at the Alamo, as well as the "Survivors of the Alamo Massacre" monument.
- Richard Andrews Monument, 1932. San Antonio. Designer: Louis Rodriguez. Monument to the first casualty of the Texas Revolution.

In April 2018, the "Monuments and Buildings of the Texas Centennial MPS" document was registered, which included multiple separate properties simultaneously listed on the National Register of Historic Places. Some of these may commemorate the Texas Revolution. These are:

- Jackson County Monument,
- Camp Colorado Replica in Coleman County
- Pioneer Woman Monument in Denton County
- Erath Memorial Arch in Erath County
- Matagorda County Monument
- San Patricio de Hibernia Monument, in San Patricio County
- Sons of San Patricio Monument, in San Patricio County.

=== James Fannin memorials ===
- Fannin Battleground State Historic Site28°41′11″N 97°14′2″W, Fannin, Texas
- Fannin Memorial Monument, Goliad, Texas

=== Amon B. King memorials ===
- Monument to Amon B. King and His Men, designed by Raoul Josset, Refugio, Texas.

=== Sam Houston memorials ===
There are a number of memorials to Sam Houston, known mostly for his leadership in the Texas Revolution, including:

- A Tribute to Courage, by sculptor David Adickes, 67 feet (20 m) tall
- Houston, Texas is named for him

=== Former monuments ===
- Dallas: Fair Park, replica of the Alamo. Dedicated by the Daughters of the Republic of Texas in 1936.
