= Texas Park Road 27 =

Highway in Texas, United States

PR 27

Route information
- Maintained by TxDOT
- Length: 1.033 mi (1.662 km)
- Existed: 1940–present

Major junctions
- South end: Fannin Battleground State Historic Site
- FM 2506
- North end: US 59 / FM 2987 in Fannin

Location
- Country: United States
- State: Texas
- Counties: Goliad

Highway system
- Highways in Texas; Interstate; US; State; Former; Toll; Loops; Spurs; FM/RM; Park; Rec
← PR 26	→ PR 28
← SH 161	SH 162	→ SH 163

Park Road 27 or PR 27 is a Texas park road that runs from Fannin to the Fannin Battleground State Historic Site, which is the site of the Battle of Coleto. PR 27 was originally SH 162 and briefly Spur 91 before gaining its current designation in 1940.

== Route description ==
PR 27 begins within Fannin Battleground State Historic Site, forming a loop around the park. After the loop, the park road heads west and intersects Farm to Market Road 2506 (FM 2506). At this point, PR 27 turns north on a two-lane undivided road, heading through open fields. The road heads into the community of Fannin and passes homes. PR 27 reaches their northern terminus at an interchange with US 59, where the road continues north as FM 2987.

== History ==
The route was originally designated as State Highway 162 but was redesignated as Spur 91 in May 1940, only to be promptly redesignated again in July as Park Road 27. SH 162 has not been used since.

== Major intersections ==
The entire route is in Fannin, Goliad County.

mi	km	Destinations	Notes
0.000	0.000	Fannin Battlegroud State Historic Site	Roadway forms loop around park
		FM 2506 south	
1.033	1.662	US 59 / FM 2987 north	Interchange
1.000 mi = 1.609 km; 1.000 km = 0.621 mi
