= Fannin Memorial Monument =

Fannin Memorial Monument may refer to:

- Goliad State Park and Historic Site (Goliad, Texas) monument by Raoul Josset, 1939
- Fannin Battleground State Historic Site (Fannin, Texas) monument
