= Fannin =

Fannin may refer to:

== Geography ==
- Fannin, Kentucky, an unincorporated community
- Fannin, Mississippi, a rural community, formerly a town
- Fannin, Texas, an unincorporated community
- Fannin County, Georgia
- Fannin County, Texas
- Fannin Battleground State Historic Site, Texas
- Camp Fannin, a U.S. Army Infantry Replacement Training Center and prisoner-of-war camp near Tyler, Texas, during World War II
- Fanning Springs, Levy County, Florida
- Fannin Range, a Canadian mountain range

== People ==
- Cliff Fannin (1924–1966), American Major League Baseball pitcher
- Eustace Fannin (1915–1997), South African tennis player
- Harold Fannin Jr. (born 2004), American football player
- James Fannin (1804–1836), Texas Army colonel and a leader in the Texas Revolution against Mexico
- James R. Fannin (born 1949), American politician
- Jody Fannin (born 1993), British auto racing driver
- Mario Fannin (born 1987), American football player
- Paul Fannin (1907–2002), American businessman and politician, former Senator from and Governor of Arizona
