= National Register of Historic Places listings in Goliad County, Texas =

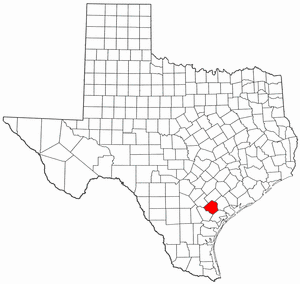
Location of Goliad County in Texas

This is a list of the National Register of Historic Places listings in Goliad County, Texas.

This is intended to be a complete list of properties and districts listed on the National Register of Historic Places in Goliad County, Texas. There are one National Historic Landmark, five districts, and seven other individually listed properties on the National Register in the county. Among these, either among individual properties or contained within districts, are two State Historic Sites, four State Antiquities Landmarks, and numerous Recorded Texas Historic Landmarks.

This National Park Service list is complete through NPS recent listings posted March 21, 2025.

== Current listings ==
The publicly disclosed locations of National Register properties and districts may be seen in a mapping service provided.

	Name on the Register	Image	Date listed	Location	City or town	Description
1	Charles H. and Catherine B. Baker House	Charles H. and Catherine B. Baker House	July 25, 1985 (#85001616)	401 S. Commercial St. 28°39′52″N 97°23′35″W	Goliad	
2	Dr. L.W. and Martha E.S. Chilton House	Dr. L.W. and Martha E.S. Chilton House	April 9, 1998 (#98000354)	242 N. Chilton St. 28°40′13″N 97°23′39″W	Goliad	
3	Fair Oaks Ranch		March 8, 2007 (#07000127)	14509 US 59 S 28°31′40″N 97°32′55″W	Berclair	
4	Fannin Battleground State Historic Site	Fannin Battleground State Historic Site	February 28, 2017 (#100000695)	734 FM 2506; 28°41′11″N 97°13′58″W	Fannin	State Historic Site
5	Goliad County Courthouse Historic District	Goliad County Courthouse Historic District	June 29, 1976 (#76002034)	Roughly bounded by E. Franklin, S. Washington, E. Fannin, and S. Chilton Sts. 28°39′57″N 97°23′31″W	Goliad	Includes State Antiquities Landmarks, Recorded Texas Historic Landmarks
6	Goliad State Park Historic District	Goliad State Park Historic District	March 12, 2001 (#01000258)	US 183 at San Antonio River; 28°39′18″N 97°23′14″W	Goliad	State Historic Site, includes State Antiquities Landmarks, Recorded Texas Historic Landmark
7	Nuestra Senora del Espiritu Santo de Zuniga Site	Nuestra Senora del Espiritu Santo de Zuniga Site	August 22, 1977 (#77001446)	US 183 at San Antonio River; 28°39′26″N 97°23′12″W	Goliad	State Antiquities Landmark, Recorded Texas Historic Landmark, part of Goliad State Park Historic District
8	Old Market House Museum	Old Market House Museum	October 18, 1972 (#72001362)	S. Market and Franklin Sts. 28°40′01″N 97°23′28″W	Goliad	State Antiquities Landmark, Recorded Texas Historic Landmark, part of Goliad County Courthouse Historic District
9	Capt. Barton Peck House	Capt. Barton Peck House	February 23, 1979 (#79002947)	W of Goliad at Hill and Post Oak St. 28°39′59″N 97°24′05″W	Goliad	Recorded Texas Historic Landmark
10	Presidio Nuestra Senora De Loreto De La Bahia	Presidio Nuestra Senora De Loreto De La Bahia	December 24, 1967 (#67000024)	1 mi (1.6 km). S of Goliad State Park on U.S. 183; 28°38′51″N 97°22′57″W	Goliad	Recorded Texas Historic Landmark
11	Ruins of Mission Nuestra Senora del Rosario de los Cujanes	Ruins of Mission Nuestra Senora del Rosario de los Cujanes	September 22, 1972 (#72001363)	U.S. Highway 59 about 4 miles west of Goliad; 28°38′40″N 97°26′20″W	Goliad	Part of Goliad State Park & Historic Site
12	San Antonio River Valley (West of Goliad) Rural Historic District	San Antonio River Valley (West of Goliad) Rural Historic District	December 14, 1995 (#95001453)	28°38′52″N 97°28′42″W	Goliad	
13	Jessie W. Stoddard House	Jessie W. Stoddard House	January 29, 1992 (#91002020)	Jct. of US 183, Fannin and Hord Sts. 28°39′54″N 97°23′18″W	Goliad	Recorded Texas Historic Landmark

== See also ==
- National Register of Historic Places listings in Texas
- Recorded Texas Historic Landmarks in Goliad County
