= Elizabeth Chu Richter =

Chinese-born American architect

- Occupation: Architect
- Awards: President American Institute of Architects
- Practice: Richter Architects
- Projects: National Museum of the Pacific War; Mission-Aransas National Estuarine Research Reserve; Solomon P. Ortiz National Center; Mustang Island Episcopal Conference Center

Elizabeth Chu Richter is a Chinese-born American architect. As of 2015, she is the 91st President of the American Institute of Architects, and has served as the Vice President of the Texas Society of Architects since 2007, representing over 85,500 AIA members. She also serves as a regional director representing Texas on the AIA's National Board of Directors.

She was the creator and co-producer of the radio show The Shape of Texas which covered architecture topics and was broadcast on NPR affiliate stations in Texas for eleven years.

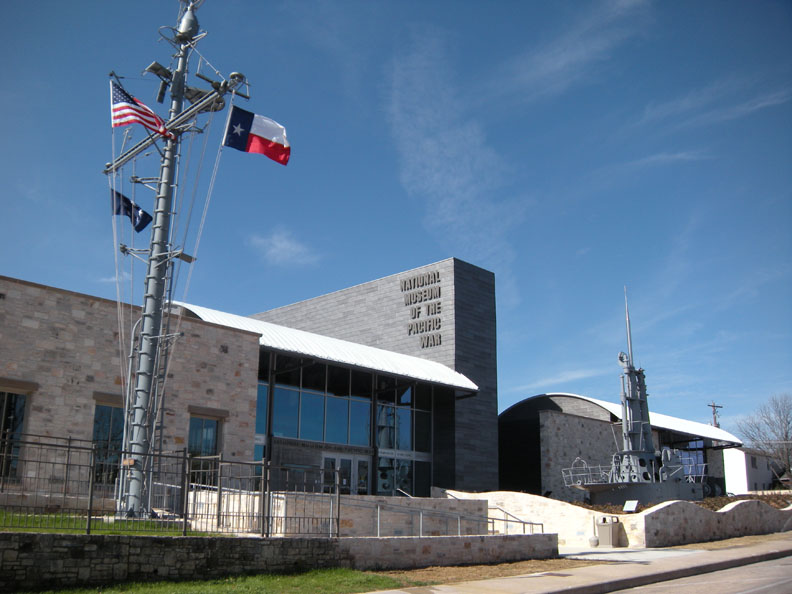
The National Museum of the Pacific War

She is the CEO of the firm Richter Architects, whose projects include a "living history" section of the National Museum of the Pacific War, the Mission-Aransas National Estuarine Research Reserve headquarters, highway rest stops, the Solomon P. Ortiz National Center, and the Mustang Island Episcopal Conference Center.

== Early life and education ==
Richter was born in Nanjing, China and spent her early childhood in Hong Kong. In 1963 when she was thirteen, her mother, Irene Chu, took her and her five siblings to Dallas, Texas. Richter studied architecture at the University of Texas at Austin and received her bachelor's degree in 1974. She joined Kipp Richter & Associates in 1989. Ritcher also entered the college of Fellows of the AIA in 2005. Her mother was present at Richter's inauguration as the 2015 President of the AIA.

== Personal life ==
Chu Richter is married to David Richter, with whom she shares awards for various architecture projects. They have been partners in life and work for decades.

Chu's father died due to illness while Richter was young. She has five other siblings.
