= Copano people =

Extinct Native American tribe from Texas

Copano
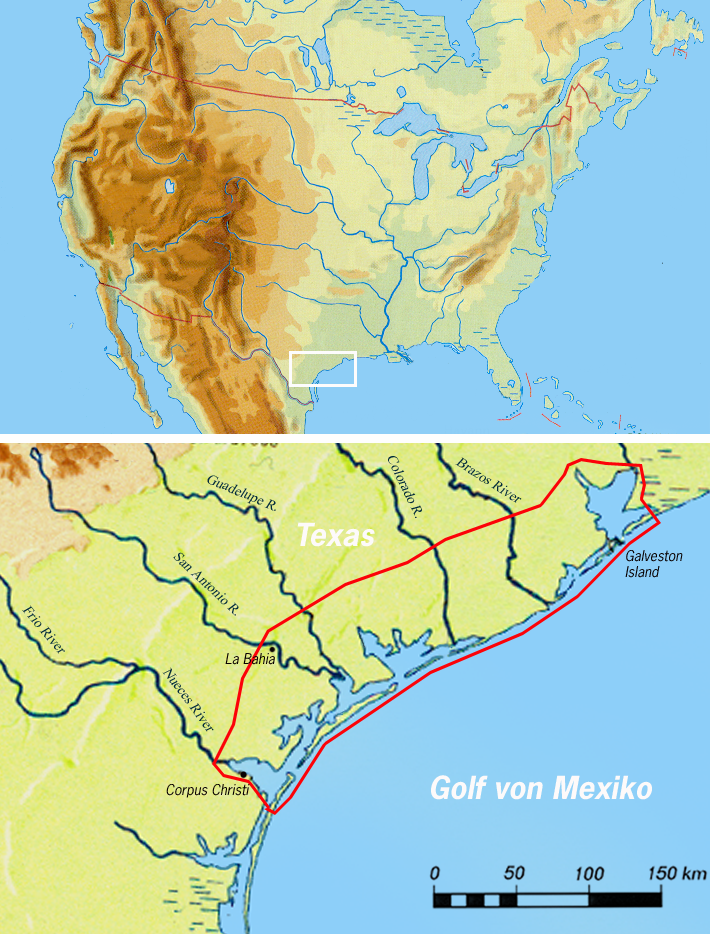
- Karankawa territory. The Kopano lived near San Antonio Bay

Total population
- extinct since the mid-19th century

Regions with significant populations
- United States (Texas)

Languages
- Karankawa language

Religion
- Indigenous religion, Roman Catholicism

Related ethnic groups
- other Karankawa peoples

The Copano were a Native American sub-tribe of Karankawa peoples from Texas.

== Territory ==
The Copano lived along the Gulf Coast of Texas, between Copano and San Antonio Bays.

== Name ==
The Copano were also known as the Cobane, Copane, Coopane, and Kopano Indians. El Copano Port was named for the tribe, who lived in the area in the 18th century.

== History ==
Between 1751 and 1828, the Kopano interacted with the Nuestra Señora del Rosario and Nuestra Señora del Refugio Missions. Those that survived the mission era likely merged into other Karankawa groups, but by 1858 all Karankawa tribes had died off.
