= Humberto "Bert" Reyes =

American cattleman and auctioneer (1928–2018)

Humberto "Bert" Villarreal Reyes (1928–2018) was a cattleman and auctioneer in Texas. He was known for his expertise in the cattle industry and his skills as an auctioneer.

== Early life and career ==
Reyes was born on a farm in Berclair, Texas to a Mexican-born father and mother from Goliad, Texas. He raised under the influence of Hereford Association President Pryor Lucas on whose ranch Reyes' father worked as a bookkeeper. Reyes graduated from Texas A&M and served as a Second Lieutenant in the United States Army during the Korean War before returning to Texas to pursue his career in the cattle industry. After completing his master's degree in Animal Science, Reyes worked for Texas A&M with a foreign agricultural contract in Mexico where he gained contacts that he would use throughout his career. In 1956, he became the field representative for the Hereford Cattle Association in Texas and Mexico. In 1959, Reyes established an auctioneering and brokerage business focused on registered cattle that would in time become the largest in the country.

== Auctioneer career ==
Reyes was known for his unique style of auctioneering, which was characterized by his rapid-fire, rhythmic chant that would often leave spectators mesmerized. As the only bilingual cattle auctioneer in North America when he entered the profession, his unique ability to seamlessly transition between English and Spanish while auctioning allowed him to pull buyers from Latin America to sales in the United States as well as sell internationally. Reyes innovated cattle auctions in Texas by moving them from weekdays to weekends, bringing in urban cattle investors who drove up cattle prices. Reyes, selling purebred Simmentals, Brangus, Beefmasters, Herefords, Charolais and Santa Gertrudis and Angus, repeatedly broke national sales records in the 1970s and 80s, and dispersed former President Lyndon B. Johnson's herd of Herefords after his death in 1973.

== Importation of "Amor" ==
In addition to his work as an auctioneer, Reyes was also a successful cattleman. He is perhaps best known for his role in the importation of "Amor," the first pure blooded Simmental bull to enter and remain in the United States for breeding purposes. Reyes drew together 6 additional cattlemen from Texas and Oklahoma to form the Simmenthal Breeders of North America. On behalf of the group, Reyes negotiated the record breaking price of $154,000 for Amor, who was sired by Perisian - the first Simmental brought to Canada from Europe. "Amor" went on to become one of the most influential sires in the Simmental breed in the United States.

== Legacy and collection ==
For almost six decades, Reyes' business operated out of the historic San Antonio stock yards. He remained even after the stockyards closed, and was the last cattleman still working out of the Union Stock Stock Exchange Building in San Antonio when he died. The Bert Reyes Collection, a complete collection of his personal papers and memorabilia, is held at the Texas A&M University San Antonio Library. The collection includes sales records, financial documents, promotional items, correspondence, images, oral history recordings and transcripts, personal and business writings, news items, property deeds and maps, periodicals, artifacts, artwork, and ephemera related to his life and career, serving as a valuable resource for researchers and scholars interested in the history of the cattle industry in Texas.
