= Spanish-Karankawa War =

Military conflict

| Location | Texas Gulf Coast |
| Result | Status quo ante bellum |

The Spanish-Karankawa War was a military conflict between New Spain and the Karankawa people that lasted from 1778 to 1789. It has been considered by historians to be an attempted genocide of the Karankawa.

== Timeline ==
Though the Spanish laid claim to the lands constituting what is now the Texas Gulf Coast, during the eighteenth century, their hold on the territory was extremely tenuous and unenforceable, with the Karankawa people, consisting of the Carancahua, Coapite, Coco, Copano, and Cujane tribes, dominating the region consisting of the coastal portions of the Brazos River and Colorado River valleys. Throughout this time, they frequently raided Spanish vessels that had laid anchor for their crews to come ashore or had run aground, as the Karankawa saw shipwrecks as a coveted source of many valuable resources.

In 1754, the Spanish constructed Mission Nuestra Senora del Rosario, referred to as Mission Rosario for short, in what is now Goliad, Texas, within the territory of the Karankawa. At this same time, they relocated the existing presidio Nuestra Señora Santa María de Loreto de la Bahía del Espíritu Santo, more commonly known as La Bahia, to the same site as Mission Rosario. The mission was established in an effort to convert them to Christianity and make use of Karankawa labour, though the vast majority of the Karankawa were uninterested in converting and merely saw the mission as an easy source of food and other goods, and they would frequently run away whenever food at the mission ran out or too much labour became demanded of them. As a result, Mission Rosario was highly unsuccessful in achieving its purpose for most of the late eighteenth century.

In March 1778, a band of Karankawa led by the Coapite warrior Joseph Maria, a former resident of Mission Rosario who had fled following his imprisonment for slaughtering a cow without permission, raided a Spanish vessel commanded by Captain Luis Antonio Andry on the Texas Gulf Coast, after initially deceiving the Spanish crew by pretending to have come to offer assistance; the Karankawa group killed everyone except Tomas de la Cruz, who was enslaved by Maria. Maria's attack is not believed to have been premeditated but rather an opportunistic endeavour at looting and an effort to increase his own prestige as a warrior amongst the various Karankawa tribes.

On 25 July 1778, Maria and a band of well-armed warriors attacked Mission Rosario with the goal of liberating its inhabitants; of the thirty-one neophytes residing in the mission, twenty-two fled during the attack. Captain Don Luis Cazorla, commander of La Bahia, assembled a pursuing party in response to the attack, but was unable to apprehend Maria and his men. The attack led to the mission's abandonment by the Spanish.

In response to the attack on Mission Rosario, Commandant General Teodoro de Croix demanded to Texas governor Baron de Ripperda that a series of punitive expeditions be ordered against the Karankawa with the assistance of other indigenous tribes, with any Karankawas that remained deported across the sea. Ripperda, who understood Spain's weak position in the region relative to the Karankawa, decided instead to bide his time and wait for the situation to develop before committing to any plan. Father Joseph Joaquin Escobar proposed a pardon to all the mission's runaways; this appeal was granted by the governor on 29 September 1778 to all who had fled the mission, with the exception of Joseph Maria and his brother Mateo. Few Karankawa, however, were enticed to return by this pardon; most remained wary and chose to stay away from the mission.

In October 1778, Colonel Domingo Cabello y Robles, who had by then earned a reputation for strictness and brutality during his tenure as governor of Nicaragua, replaced Ripperda as governor of Texas. Upon reading through the archives of letters of his gubernatorial predecessors, Cabello developed an intense distrust of the native peoples of Texas, and in particular the Karankawa. "It is impossible for any Indian to do a good thing", he wrote. Cabello intended to punish the "perfidious Indians", and in the meantime ordered Captain Cazorla to undertake preparations for such a punitive expedition.

Cazorla, who had tried to quell Karankawa resistance since being given free rein after the attack on Mission Rosario, had been completely unsuccessful due to his soldiers’ incapability of tackling the marshy and lagoonal terrain the Karankawa resided in. Recognising how mobile Karankawa raiders were due to their ability to travel across the water efficiently in pirogues, Cazorla ordered the construction of canoes for his troops to be able to pursue them. However, due to the Karankawa having killed the only two carpenters at La Bahia as a result of Cazorla's failure to defend them due to stretching his forces thin, the canoes he constructed were described as "cracked", "warped", and "in such an odd shape" that they "capsized at every moment".

In February 1779, Father Escobar personally travelled to the coast, successfully managing to convince some Karankawa to return to the mission. While there, he met with Joseph Maria and informed him of Cabello's desire to assassinate him. Maria, as a gesture of goodwill, agreed to release Tomas de la Cruz, who upon his release informed Cabello of what had happened to Captain Andry's vessel a year earlier. An infuriated Cabello began to develop plans for the extermination of the Karankawa upon hearing this news. Cabello personally travelled to La Bahia, only to be dismayed at the "deplorable state" of the underequipped garrison.

In late September 1779, Cabello learned of a group of Akokisa, Coco, and Mayeye natives travelling to the coast to engage in trade with the Karankawa; Cabello feared a possible alliance between these groups and was determined to put a stop to the meeting by whatever means necessary, ordering Lieutenant Joseph Santoja to take a party to accomplish this task. On 28 September 1779, Santoja found an encampment of Akokisas, Cocos, and Mayeyes, but they informed the lieutenant that their intentions were not to trade with the Karankawa, and they offered to lead him to an enemy camp, which Santoja found deserted when he arrived at its location. Two days later, Santoja upon a small party of Karankawa, whom his party attacked, leaving one Karankawa dead. Word of Santoja's skirmish spread, with fears of the Spanish leading many previously disunited Karankawa tribes to unify against a common enemy under Joseph Maria.

In October 1779, Athanase de Mezieres, a French diplomat, was appointed to replace Cabello as governor. De Mezieres developed a two-pronged plan to exterminate the Karankawa. The first prong involved luring Karankawa under false pretenses to villages of the Akokisa, whose loyalty De Mezieres planned to gain through improving trading relations, and have Spanish soldiers lying in wait at these villages to slaughter the Karankawa who were lured into these traps. The second prong involved amphibious assaults on Karankawa settlements along the coast. De Mezieres unexpectedly died on 2 November 1779, and Cabello thus remained in charge.

In January 1780, a vessel commanded by Captain Jose Montezuma, while being guided by the Karankawa Manuel Alegre became shipwrecked near what is now Galveston Bay. Captain Montezuma ordered that his ship's cargo be buried before the crew attempted to return to La Bahia. Before they had finished their task, the ship's crew were surrounded by Joseph Maria's men and killed, with their valuable cargo seized by the Karankawa band. Alegre managed to escape the carnage by hiding in thick brush as the massacre took place and later fleeing inland to find his family at the mouth of the San Antonio and Guadalupe Rivers, only to find out that Maria had placed a bounty on his life for his collaboration with Captain Montezuma. Upon hearing of the slaughter of Captain Montezuma and his men, Cabello became furious, realising the Karankawa dominance of the coastline to be even greater than he previously thought. The Spanish were limited in their ability to respond, however, as Karankawa warriors continued to raid La Bahia.

On 24 May 1780, Juan Jose Martinez, a Spanish citizen and resident of La Bahia, crossed paths with Joseph Maria, a childhood friend of his with whom he had grown up at Mission Rosario, near Matagorda Bay. Martinez learned from their conversation that Maria was now recognised as the head of the Karankawa, with the old chiefs no longer possessing commanding authority. Maria asked Martinez to relay to Governor Cabello that he would agree to return to Mission Rosario, along with others who had fled, in exchange for a full pardon of himself and a cessation of hostilities, a task which Martinez agreed to take on. Upon hearing of this peace offer, Cabello naturally remained cautious, suspicious, and guarded, rejecting Maria's peace offer. Unbeknownst to the governor, the Karankawa had recently been decimated by a wave of smallpox, leading to a cessation of raids on the Spanish that month. Upon eventually learning the news of this epidemic later in the summer of 1780 as many infected locals flocked to La Bahia in search of aid, Cabello was ecstatic, although he too eventually contracted the disease.

In October 1780, a major smallpox epidemic broke out among the Karankawa. Joseph Maria's brother, José Luis, informed the Spanish of this. When Maria escaped from prison, Governor Ripperdá ordered the arrest of José Luis and his long-time friend Antonio because of fears that they would flee to the coast, intending for them to be sent to Havana for forced labour as punishment. When Cabello became governor, Father Escobar saved the two prisoners with a letter in which he explained that he would use the pair as leverage in negotiations as part of Escobar's quest to win back the runaways.

In early 1781, Antonio died of smallpox. Luis also nearly died, but Captain José Santoja allowed Escobar to move him from the cell back to Mission Rosario to be cared for. Captain Santoja later required tar to repair a canoe, and because nobody else from La Bahia dared to go to the coast, Luis offered to go. His captor agreed to the offer, freeing him. After two months on the coast, Luis returned on 1 August 1781, bringing back news of the devastation wrought on the Karankawa population by the smallpox epidemic as well as the black tar resin.

Despite the devastation of the epidemic, Joseph Maria had been able to maintain his influence among the Carancahuas, Coapites, Cujanes, and non-Karankawa mission runaways. Maria remained committed to peace. Luis relayed Maria's offer to Cabello to end all hostilities and allow the Spanish to explore the coast if he was granted a pardon. Cabello refused, interpreting this offer as a sign of weakness and wanting to conquer the strategically valuable Texas coastline.

Four months later, the French merchant Nicholas de La Mathe arrived on the scene. La Mathe was determined to eradicate the Karankawa, as the war was detrimental to his business ventures. He developed an extensive plan to crush them by force, which would consist of building eight boats capable of transporting twenty troops each. They would go down the Rio Grande to Matagorda Island and massacre the Karankawa who lived there; any survivors attempting to escape would be corralled towards the mainland where an armed Spanish force would be waiting to destroy them. La Mathe offered to personally pay for the housing required for the expedition, believing that conquering the Karankawa would yield immense fortunes for himself. La Mathe's plan quickly fell apart, however, as he severely lacked the manpower needed to carry it out, as Coahuila, Louisiana, and Texas could not spare this number of troops. Not only that, but the region lacked suitable timber to build the vessels that La Mathe desired.

As La Mathe's plan collapsed, he blamed Joseph Antonio de la Garza Falcón, the captain of Camargo, writing a seething letter to the commandant general scapegoating him for the plan's failure to take off, but Falcón wrote his own letter that much more accurately depicted the meeting between La Mathe and him. Cabello was now furious with La Mathe, and his fury was only exacerbated by the news of a group of Wichitas, whom La Mathe had brokered a peace with in 1778, broke into Cabello's property and stole two of his best horses.

While La Mathe's plan went nowhere, the Karankawa under Maria adopted a defensive posture. No longer did he launch raids against the Spanish; instead, from 1783 to 1785, the Spanish relentlessly patrolled the coast, attempting to coax the Karankawa into a battle. Only in two instances did a skirmish break out and cause casualties among the Karankawa, however. Nonetheless, these constant patrols by the Spanish severely limited the movement of the Karankawa, inhibiting their ability to hunt large game because of being hunted by the Spanish themselves.

Cabello around this time decided to implement La Mathe's genocidal plan himself. Cabello was aware that boats were needed for the plan to succeed, so he turned to the shipbuilder La Foré, who told Cabello during a meeting that he would only be able to fulfill Cabello's demands for ships if and only if he was given six months, a hefty infusion of capital, two additional carpenters, a team of six axemen, and twenty presidials to stand guard over him and protect him from being targeted by the Karankawa. Cabello was nervous about these costs and asked the new commandant general, Felipe de Neve, for his approval of the plan. However, Neve had died, as Cabello found out after ten months of waiting for his response.

José Antonio Rengel, who was unfamiliar with Texas, took over as commandant general and immediately ordered Cabello to take 100 troops on campaign against the Karankawas. Cabello, however, responded that this was impossible and informed Rengel that the plan would only be realistic if he could spare 600 men and send them to him for such a mission. This caused Rengel to become deferential to Cabello in their future exchanges. Nevertheless, Cabello's plan faltered for the same reasons La Mathe's plan had faltered earlier. In September 1786, Rengel's replacement, Jacobo de Ugarte y Loyola, officially suspended the plans for the genocide of the Karankawa "until a more opportune time". However, this did not stop the monthly expeditions into their territory, and thus the conflict continued.

Towards the end of 1786, Cabello left Texas as he was reassigned to become deputy inspector of troops in Cuba. Rafael Martínez Pacheco, a man who understood the futility of fighting the Karankawa, replaced him and made peace overtures. On 26 June 1787, Joseph Maria and the sons of nine other chiefs arrived in San Antonio to begin peace negotiations, and were celebrated upon their arrival. Maria took communion at the local church, while the Spanish marked the occasion with lavish gift-giving. Maria and Governor Martínez agreed to a temporary truce. In exchange for restoring access to the missions for the Karankawa, Maria allowed the royal engineer Ángel Angelino, along with eleven Spanish soldiers, to explore and chart the coastline.

The peace was short-lived. Weeks later, after Angelino had explored the coast and prepared to head back to San Antonio, Maria's wife, María del Rosario became irate at her husband due to his demands that she accompany him to San Antonio. She refused to go with him on the journey back to San Antonio. Other Karankawa became enraged over Maria displaying such insolence towards his wife. Pedro Pérez, a Spanish sergeant, attempted to defuse the tension, but he was shot in the head by Chepillo, a drunk Karankawa. A fight erupted, and during the clash, a Spanish-allied Indian called Mathías killed two Karankawa with a rifle.

Maria lost substantial influence among his people after the incident, while Martínez was chastised by his superiors for his attempts to negotiate with the indigenous people of the coast. The belligerent Juan de Ugalde, whom Martínez was subordinate to, was incensed and ordered an expedition to head to the coast and exterminate the Karankawa immediately. The governor delayed troop movements and expressed his disapproval of these orders, and he even subverted these instructions and attempted to once again make peace with the Karankawa. Eventually, he acquiesced to his superior's orders and launched an offensive operation, but it was halted indefinitely by a massive rainstorm.

Diplomatic attempts at peace went nowhere in 1788. Captain Luis Cazorla rejected two peace offers by the Karankawa, believing them to be insincere. Cazorla, having spent ten years at La Bahía, believed only a peace after the Karankawa had suffered a serious military setback would be acceptable. He died on 4 October 1788, however, never realising his dream of defeating the Karankawa.

The last major battle of the war took place in February 1789, when eight Karankawa raided La Bahía and killed one of its citizens. Twenty presidials pursued the Karankawa raiders, but retreated when they saw some 400 Karankawa lighting fires and aggressively making their presence known. La Bahía's new captain, Manuel Espadas, summoned a force of eighty-nine troops and marched towards the Karankawa encampment. The men led by Espadas at first attempted to encircle the Karankawa, but they themselves were enveloped as the Karankawa saw what they were trying to do. In the ensuing battle, the Spanish firearms proved superior in their lethality; eleven Karankawa were killed on the battlefield and countless others wounded, while the Spanish suffered a mere two wounded.

Commandant Ugalde was very satisfied with the results of the battle. He praised Espadas and told him he would speak well of him to the viceroy. He ordered a ramping up of Spanish patrols in the territory of the Karankawa, commanding Espadas and Governor Martínez not to offer peace to the Karankawa. However, both of them disobeyed these orders. On 10 November 1789, the Copano chief Balthasar and seven of his warriors came to La Bahía to negotiate peace. Joseph Maria, having died months earlier, was not at the negotiations and had not lived long enough to see peace between the Spanish and Karankawa. Martínez believed that regularly supplying the Karankawa with gifts was much more cost-efficient than fighting a war with them and ordered Espadas to receive them graciously. It was agreed by the Spanish that they would reopen Mission Rosario with the provision that the Karankawas could come and go whenever they pleased. The Spanish also began constructing a second mission, Nuestra Señora del Refugio, which secular authorities recognised as being primarily a centre for dispensing tribute rather than for conversion. In exchange for these actions by the Spanish, the Karankawa agreed to make peace. The Spanish-Karankawa War came to an end.

== See also ==
- Sullivan Expedition
- California genocide
