= Heroes of the Alamo Monument =

Monument in Austin, Texas, U.S.

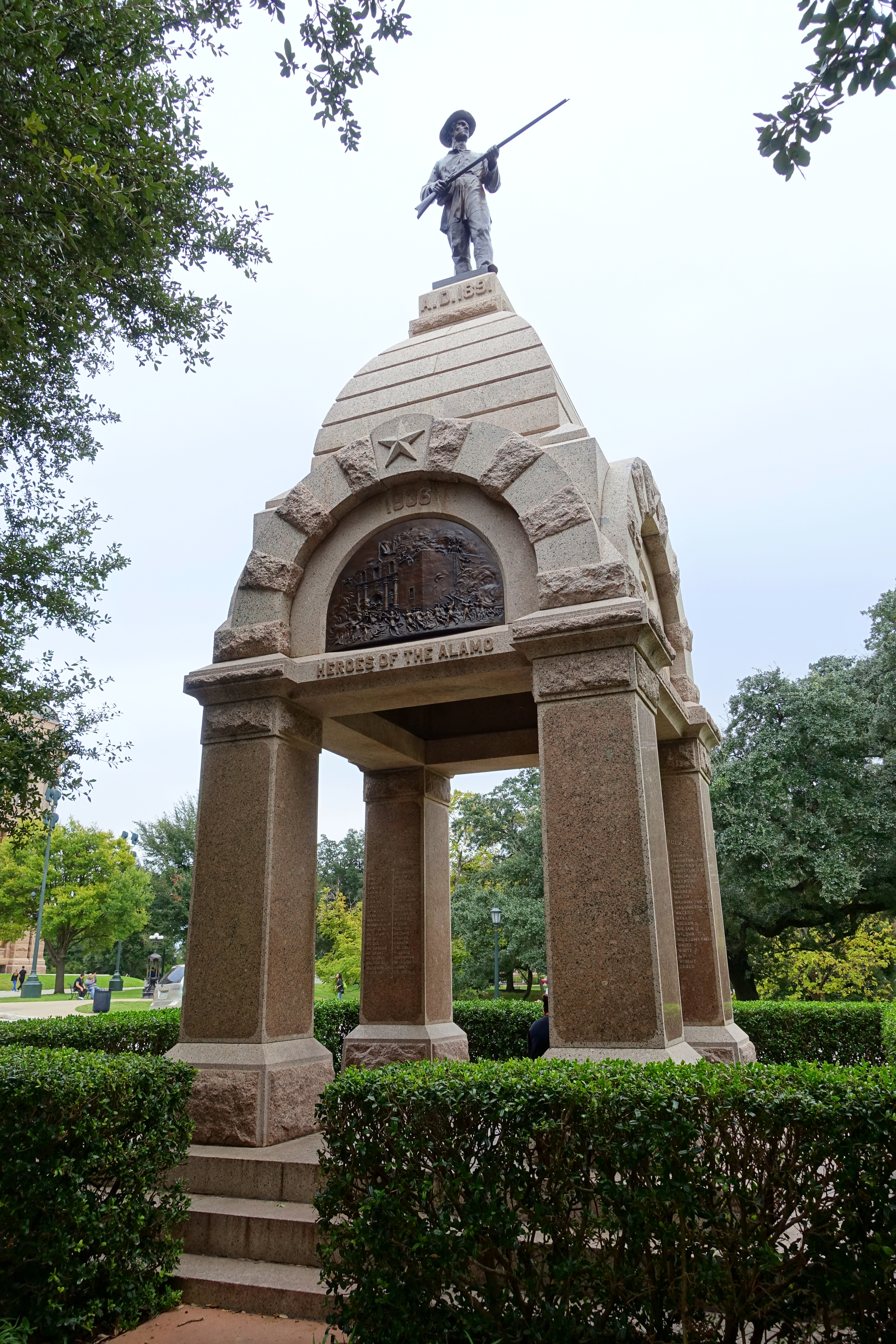
- The monument in 2015
- Interactive map of Heroes of the Alamo Monument
- Location: Austin, Texas, United States
- Coordinates: 30.273833°N 97.740503°W

The Heroes of the Alamo Monument is an outdoor memorial commemorating those who fought and died during the Battle of the Alamo, installed on the Texas State Capitol grounds, in Austin, Texas, United States. It was designed by J.S. Clark, sculpted by Carl Rohl-Smith, and erected in 1891. The monument features a Texas Sunset Red Granite base topped by a bronze statue of a Texan carrying a muzzle-loading rifle. Among the names inscribed in the base's supports are James Bowie, David Crockett, and William B. Travis.

== See also ==
- 1891 in art
- List of Texas Revolution monuments and memorials
