= Karankawa people =

Historical Native American tribe from Gulf of Mexico

Karankawa
Karankawa
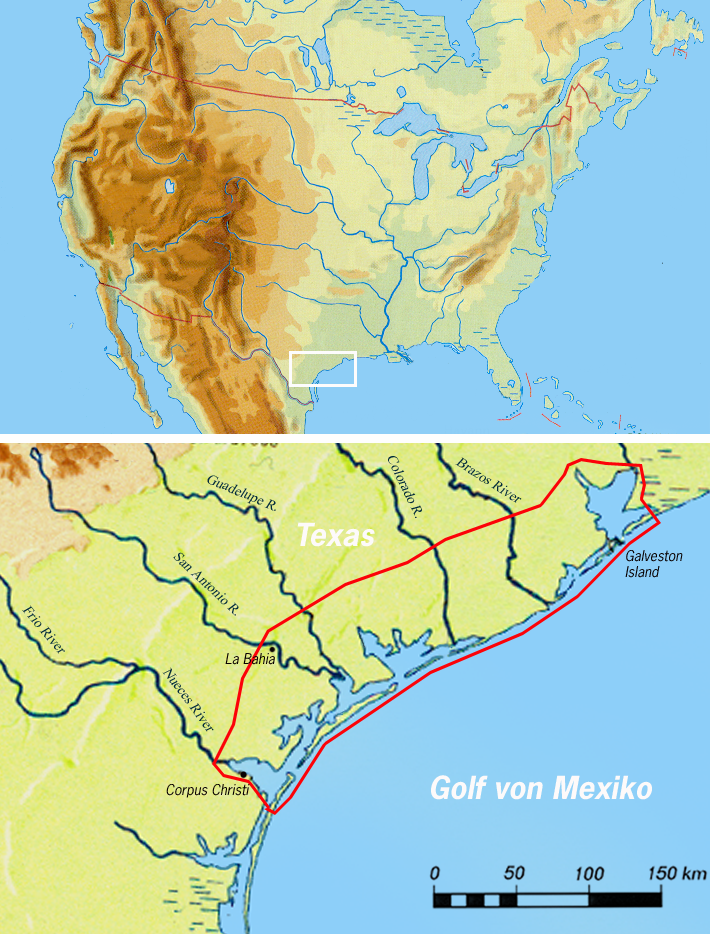
- Karankawa territory

Total population
- extinct as a tribe since the 19th century

Regions with significant populations
- United States (Texas)

Languages
- Karankawa language, English, Spanish

Religion
- Indigenous religion

The Karankawa (/kəˈræŋkəwə/ kə-RANK-ə-wə) were an Indigenous group concentrated in southern Texas along the coast of the Gulf of Mexico, largely in the lower Colorado River and Brazos River valleys. They consisted of several independent, seasonal semi-nomadic groups who shared a language and some culture.

From the onset of European colonization, the Karankawa had violent encounters with the Spanish. After one attack by the Spanish, who ambushed the Karankawa after the establishment of Presidio La Bahía in 1722, the Karankawa allegedly felt "deeply betrayed [and] viewed Spanish colonial settlement with hostility."

In the 19th century, European-American colonists arrived in their land under the leadership of Stephen Austin. He commissioned a captain to expel the Karankawa from the Austin land grant, leading to multiple attacks, including the Skull Creek massacre of 19 Karankawa.

In 1824, Stephen F. Austin sent Captain Randal Jones with a group of 23 Army soldiers to what is now Brazoria County to fight and disperse the Karankawa Indians from their encampment. Fifteen Indians were killed, and the remaining fled the area. This event is known as the Battle of Jones Creek.

By the 1840s, the Karankawa, now exiled, split into two groups, one of which settled on Padre Island while the other fled into the Mexican state of Tamaulipas. In 1858, Mexican rancher Juan Nepomuceno Cortina led a group of Mexicans and Texan colonists against what was believed to be the Karankawa's last known refuge, killing many. By 1891, the Karankawa ceased to exist as a functioning tribe. Today, however, there are unrecognized tribes who claim Karankawa descent.

== Name ==
The name Karakawa has numerous spellings in Spanish, French, and English.

Swiss-American ethnologist Albert S. Gatschet wrote that the name Karakawa may have come from the Comecrudo terms klam or glám, meaning "dog", and kawa, meaning "to love, like, to be fond of." The plural form of kawa is kakáwa, so the term would mean "dog-lovers" or "dog-raisers."

The Tonkawa called them Wrestlers ("Keles" or "Killis"). They alternatively called them the barefooted or those without moccasins ("Yakokon kapa-i"), but this name was also applied to other groups with which the Tonkawe were acquainted. The Lipan Apache called the Karankawa the "people who walk in the water" ("Nda Kun dadehe"), possibly referring to their mode of fishing and catching turtles, or simply their location near the swampy coast. The Karankawa called themselves "Karankawa" as well.

Later speculation placed the Karankawa language in the Cariban linguistic stock. Linguistic data suggests that the Karankawa name originated from the old Spanish Main, "Kalina," and a suffix from a Northern Carib tribe, "kxura, "meaning "people." A compound emerges: Karinxkxura, meaning "Carib people." But this theory is disputed, and ultimately, the origins of the name "Karankawa" remain unknown.

Alternate spellings of the name Karankawa have historically included: Carancahua, Carancagua, Carancaguase, Carancahuare, Caranchuasye, Carancahuase, Carancahuaye, Carancahuaze, Carancohuace, Caray, Carrai, Carray, Saray.

== Origins ==
According to some contemporary sources, the migrations of their ancestors were entirely unknown to the Karankawa of the early 19th century.

Linguist Herbert Landar argues that linguistic evidence suggests that the Karankawa language and people originated from a Carib subgroup. He suggested that they may have migrated from the south into Tamaulipas and Texas during the late 15th century and was probably done over a long period of time by short bursts of migration. Scholars also have speculated that the Karankawa were descended from a group of Carib Indians who arrived by sea from the Caribbean basin. This is partially based on the similarity of their physical appearance to Indigenous peoples of the Caribbean, but no ethnographic or archaeological evidence has confirmed this speculation.

Recent archaeological records that used radiocarbon dating for artefacts indicated that these Native groups had been in the area of Texas as early as the fifth millennium BCE.

== Lifestyle ==
=== Seasonal nomadic lifestyle ===
The Karankawa voyaged from place to place on a seasonal basis in their dugouts, made from large trees with the bark left intact. They travelled in groups of thirty to forty people and remained in each place for about four weeks. After European contact, canoes were of two kinds, both being called "awa'n": the original dugout and old skiffs obtained from the whites. Neither was used for fishing but for transportation only, and their travels were limited to the waters close to the land. The women, children, and possessions travelled in the hold while the men stood on the stern and poled the canoe. Upon landing at their next destination, the women set up wigwams (called ba'ak in their native language) and the men hauled the boats on the shore. Their campsites were always close to the shoreline of the nearby body of water.

They constructed houses by arranging willow branches in a circle, bending the tops of the branches toward the centre, and interlocking them in wickerwork. This wickerwork was fastened with deerskin. Upon this framework, the Karankawa lay deer, wildcat, panther or bear skins, again fastened with deer hide thongs.

The next step was to make a fire. After European contact, the Karankawa sought matches or tinderboxes from settlers; otherwise, they resorted to the traditional method of using their firesticks, which they always carried in a package of deerhide thongs. The fire was always made in the centre of their dwellings and kept burning day and night. They used animal hides and pelts to sit and sleep on within their dwellings. Their household goods and utensils included wooden spoons, ceramic vessels, fishbone needles, and fine deer sinew.

=== Environment ===
The Karankawa travelled to the coastal region. They hunted and gathered food from rivers and by the shore.

In the region that the Karankawa inhabited, numerous small chunks of asphaltum have been found along the coast from oil seepage beneath the Gulf of Mexico. These chunks were used to bind arrowheads to their shafts; as a coating for pottery such as ollas, jars, and bowls; and as a way to waterproof woven baskets.

=== Cuisine ===
Karankawa cuisine included venison, rabbit, fowl, fish, turtles, oysters, and other shellfish. Their cuisine also included food gathered from the wild, such as berries, persimmons, wild grapes, sea-bird eggs, tuna and nopales (prickly pear cactus fruit and paddles, respectively), and nuts. They boiled food in ceramic pots or roasted entrés and seasoned their dishes with chile.

After European contact, the Karankawa made bread from imported wheat flour. They laid the dough on a flat stone and then baked it on an open fire. They also enjoyed imported sweet coffee.

The Karankawa were skilled at obtaining pure, fresh water. White settlers did not know where they obtained it, because the wells of the whites had a brackish taste.

=== Historical perspectives on anthropophagy and the cannibalism myth ===
Colonial literature and 19th-century Texan historiography frequently depicted the Karankawa people as practicing cannibalism, relying on European chronicles dating back to René-Robert Cavelier de La Salle's establishment of Fort Saint Louis in 1685. In contrast, modern anthropology, ethnohistory, and archaeology generally characterize widespread or dietary cannibalism among the Karankawa as a colonial trope or misconception. Scholars argue that these narratives were utilized by historical actors to delegitimize the indigenous population, providing a rationale for their forced displacement and removal.

==== Analysis of 17th-century primary sources ====
French and Spanish colonial accounts from the late 17th century document instances of anthropophagy, describing it as a restricted, ritualistic warfare practice. The testimony of Jean-Baptiste Talon—who was adopted by the Karankawa following the destruction of the French fort—provides a direct account of these boundaries:

"We all went naked like them... The only food that horrified them was that prepared with human flesh, because they were cannibals, but only toward their savage enemies. They never ate a single Frenchman they killed because, as they said, they simply did not eat them."

==== Archaeological and ethnohistorical evidence ====
Archaeological research along the Texas Gulf Coast has provided data regarding Karankawa subsistence patterns that counter the narratives of habitual cannibalism. Excavations of seasonal campsites have recovered faunal remains and kitchen middens indicating a specialized coastal diet based on fishing, shellfish harvesting, and the seasonal hunting of deer and bison. Archaeological surveys of human skeletal remains associated with Karankawa sites have not documented physical evidence of dietary anthropophagy, such as uniform cut marks, scraping, or intentional thermal alteration.

According to ethnohistorical analyses, the depiction of the Karankawa as cannibals became more prevalent during the 1820s under Stephen F. Austin and Anglo-American colonization efforts. Documentation indicates that branding the population as cannibals lowered legal and moral barriers for settlers, which facilitated military campaigns and land appropriation. Additionally, earlier historical sources, such as Álvar Núñez Cabeza de Vaca's 1528 narrative, record that the Karankawa expressed distress upon discovering that a group of stranded Spanish survivors had practiced cannibalism to avoid starvation.

== Culture ==
=== Language and communication ===
Little is known of the extinct Karankawa language, which may have been a language isolate. The Karankawa also possessed a gesture language for conversing with people from other Native American tribes.

The Karankawa were noted for their skill in communicating with each other over long distances using smoke signals. The Karankawa could make the smoke of a small fire ascend toward the sky in many different ways, and it was as intelligible to them across long distances as their language. Their methods are unknown.

=== Manners and customs ===
The Karankawa had a specific way of conversing. They carefully repressed their breath while speaking; at the end of their sentences, they exhaled heavily, releasing the air they held back during speaking. Moreover, their expression was interpreted by Europeans as impassive, especially because they never looked at the person to whom they were speaking. Their pronunciation was very exact, and they ridiculed poor elocution by the whites who tried to learn their language. The Europeans described their general demeanour as surly and fatigued.

They did not have a regular sleep schedule, but slept whenever they wished. They also ate and drank at all times of the day.

Karankawa never communicated their native names to the whites. However, they all adopted English or Spanish names. Many men adopted American military epithets and Christian names, and they would change these frequently.

Among the Karankawa existed an in-law taboo. Once a man and his wife had become, in the Karankawa sense, married, the husband and his children were no longer allowed to enter the residence of his wife's parents, nor could his wife's parents enter his or his children's home. These two groups were also no longer allowed to talk with one another and never came face to face with one another. If a situation of coming face to face with one another arose, both parties averted their eyes and moved away from each other. This taboo only seemed to apply to the husbands and their children, most likely due to the inconvenience on the wife's part, as Karankawans were typically patrilocal.

=== Music ===
The Karankawa possessed at least three musical instruments: a large gourd filled with stones, which was shaken to produce sound, a fluted piece of wood, which the Karankawa drew a stick over to produce sound, and a flute, which was softly blown.

=== Sports ===
The Karankawa practiced hatchet throwing, recreational brawls with knives, ball games, and wrestling matches. No gambling or guessing games seemed to have developed among the Karankawa. The Karankawa were also noted for their remarkable physical feats, such as continuing to fight after being wounded in battle, breaking ice with their bodies, and swimming in freezing water.

The Karankawa excelled at archery and made their own bows and arrows, and were renowned for great skill, whether standing on land or in calm or turbulent waters. Their bows were made of red cedar wood, and they made them according to the height of each archer, reaching from the foot to the chin or eye. The bows were always kept in perfect repair. The arrows were about a yard long, tipped with steel, and fletched with wild goose feathers. Karankawa engaged in archery for hunting and as a recreational activity. They often shot at the mark or shot arrows perpendicularly into space. The shooting matches they held were lively and festive. Many young men were able to split in two the previous arrow in the target from a distance of at least 80 feet.

=== Social institutions ===
==== Tribal leadership ====
The groups of Karankawa were commonly led by two chiefs: a civil government chief with a hereditary succession in the male lines, and a war chief, probably appointed by the civil government chief. No evidence of a confederacy, like that of the Caddo or Muscogee, was found. The Karankawa were probably a loose-knit body living under separate chiefs, only united by the common language and shared war expeditions.

The ritual to become a chief has been studied by 18th-century Spaniards. They have stated that a selection starts from many candidates, and each is injured by a comb created from the spines of a sea fish, long wounds being dug into their skin from the top of their heads to the soles of their feet and then tied to a pole for several days to either emerge thin or emaciated and close to death. While this description can indeed be a ritual to choose a chief, a diary of Fray Gaspar Jose De Solis states that he suspects these rituals could simply be a puberty rite or an initiation ritual to a brotherhood.

==== Gender and family structures ====
One aspect of the Karankawa culture was their recognition of three gender roles: male, female, and a third role taken on by some men and women. Men who took on this third role are called monanguia (see Two-Spirit for similar concepts in Native American cultures generally). Monanguia generally took on female roles and activities in daily life, while also playing a special role in religious rites. According to some accounts, the berdache also performed as passive sexual partners for other men.

The written accounts of Álvar Núñez Cabeza de Vaca mentions bride price and bride service as part of a Karankawa marriage. While the bride price is assumed to be the generalized system in the Indigenous population found by Cabeza de Vaca where the groom gives presents to the parents of the girl he wishes to marry, to secure their permission, the bride service is based on a ritual where the husband must give every morsel of food he managed to collect or hunt to his wife. His wife then delivers the bounty to her parents and in return is given food to give back to her husband. This ritual goes on for an unknown number of months, but when it is concluded, the pair typically then engages in patrilocal residence. In terms of marriage, divorce is a common aspect typically only to marriages that have not created any children and is unlikely if children have been born from the marriage. Between the husband and wife, no signs of fondness, intimacy, or special treatment were observed. The Karankawa reacted strongly and sometimes violently to Europeans interfering in marital or familial affairs.

The Karankawa were said to have great compassion and tenderness for their children. Mothers carried babies, not yet able to walk, on their backs, wrapped in a loop of animal hide.

=== Appearance ===
==== Physical character ====
Many Europeans noted the sharp contrasts in appearance between Karankawa men and women. The women were described as plainer, shorter, and of stouter build than the men. The men were very tall, of strong athletic build, and had coarse, black hair. Most men wore their hair to the waist. Their foreheads were mostly low and broad, and the heads larger than most Europeans of the time. The men, in contrast with the women, had lithe builds and slender hands and feet. Their skin color was said to be lighter and closer to cinnamon-colored than the women. Both men and women were noted for their spectacularly white teeth, even elders.

==== Dress and adornment ====
Karankawa people practiced forehead flattening. They shaped the foreheads of babies by first with a piece of cloth, then a thin board, and then a wadded cloth. Each of these was tied to the head with a bandage and left to stay there about one year.

The men wore hide breechcloths, while the women wore deerhide skirts. They did not wear headcovers or shoes. Some women of the tribe obtained European clothing occasionally, but would only tear them apart or wear them temporarily. European blankets were of greater use to the tribe, worn fastened to their bodies during cold weather and pinned with thorns. Both men and women wore a small bracelet of undressed deer skin. In the warm climate, children did not wear clothing until they were about 10 years old.

The Karankawa had distinctive tattoos, notably, a blue circle tattooed over each cheekbone, one horizontal blue line from the outer angle of the eye toward the ear, three perpendicular parallel lines on the chin from the middle of the lower lip downward, and two other lines extending down from under each corner of the mouth. Moreover, 16th-century European explorers wrote that Karankawa people had labrets, or piercings of cane on the lower lips, nose, and other parts of the body.

Karanawa often practiced head-flattening and tattooing.

Men, women, and children alike rubbed sharks' oil on their entire bodies regularly to deter mosquitoes effectively and to keep their skin soft and supple. Europeans who encountered the Karankawa were disgusted by the odor.

The women wore no ornaments, while the men wore many ornaments. Men's long hair was braided with three strands. They inserted bright items (such as ribbons or colored flannel). The women never braided their hair nor combed it regularly. The men wore necklaces of small shells, glass beads, pistachios, and thin metal disks on their throats (never on their chests). They also wore finger rings.

=== Religion and ritual ===
Europeans knew limited information about the rituals of the Karankawa because the latter did not reveal the purposes of their actions or their beliefs. When Joutel, an explorer and companion of Robert Cavalier de La Salle, questioned their religious beliefs, the Karankawa only pointed at the sky.

At the full moon and after very successful hunting or fishing expeditions, the Karankawa traditionally held a ceremony. After gathering around a central fire, they boiled a strong and bitter brew from the leaves of the yaupon tree and stirred it until the top was covered with a yellowish froth. This brew was shared and all the Karankawa drank freely. Although this brew was said to be intoxicating, Europeans did not notice any visible effects on the natives. One native stood within the circle of men, wrapped up to his head in skins, and he bent over as he walked around the fire. They chanted in chromatic ascending and descending tones, and all the natives joined in the chorus. This ceremony continued throughout the night.

Other than this, only a few other rituals were observed, and their purposes are unknown. The Karankawa stared at the sun when it disappeared into the sea, like some other native groups of the area. They also smoked tobacco through their nostrils first to the north, then to the east, west, and south. They frequently whistled at certain times and apparently for some objective, but ultimately for unknown purposes.

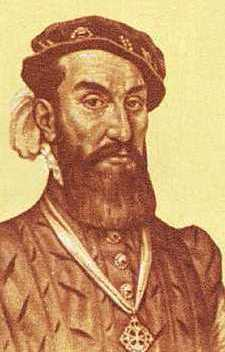
Portrait of Álvar Núñez Cabeza de Vaca

Jean-Baptist Talon, in response to interrogation, reported, "one could only infer that they have some confused impression of the immortality of their souls and the resurrection of the dead by the ceremonies that they observe in the burial of their dead. After having wrapped the corpse in a well-prepared buffalo hide, the same one that he had used in life to cover himself, they bury him with his club, his bow, and his arrows, a quantity of smoked meat, some corn and vegetables, and two pieces of a certain rock that they use instead of gun flint to make fire.[[For this purpose they make a little hole in one of the pieces of wood, which is flat, and which they lean against something; and having sharpened the other, which is round, they adjust the point of i in the hole and make some fire by rubbing these two pieces of wood, by turning the one that is round between their hands, as fast as they can]] and all that in order that he may use them (so they say) when he wakes up".

==== Cannibalism ====
According to some sources, the Karankawa practiced ritual cannibalism, in common with other Gulf coastal tribes of present-day Texas and Louisiana.

Álvar Núñez Cabeza de Vaca, a Spanish conquistador who lived among the Karankawa for several years in the 1530s and wrote a memoir, made no mention of cannibalism except for ritualistic consumption of deceased relatives in the form of funeral ashes "presented in water for the relatives to drink." Upon his return to Spain, Cabeza De Vaca noted in his written report to the King, "that five Christians quartered on the coast [Galveston, the Island of Doom] came to the extremity of eating each other. Only the body of the last one, whom nobody was left to eat, was found unconsumed. Their names were Sierra, Diego Lopez, Corral, Palacios, and Gonzalo Ruiz,"this, after shipwrecking off Galveston Bay. The Karankawa people "were so shocked at this [Spanish] cannibalism that, if they had seen it sometime earlier, they surely would have killed every one of us." Whites never actually witnessed an act of cannibalism, and second- and third-hand accounts are of disputed credibility.

=== Dogs ===
The Karankawa kept dogs that accompanied them on hunts, swims, and recreational activities. The dogs were voiceless, with straight ears and fox-like snouts.

== History ==
=== Early encounters with the Spanish and French (16th - 17th centuries) ===
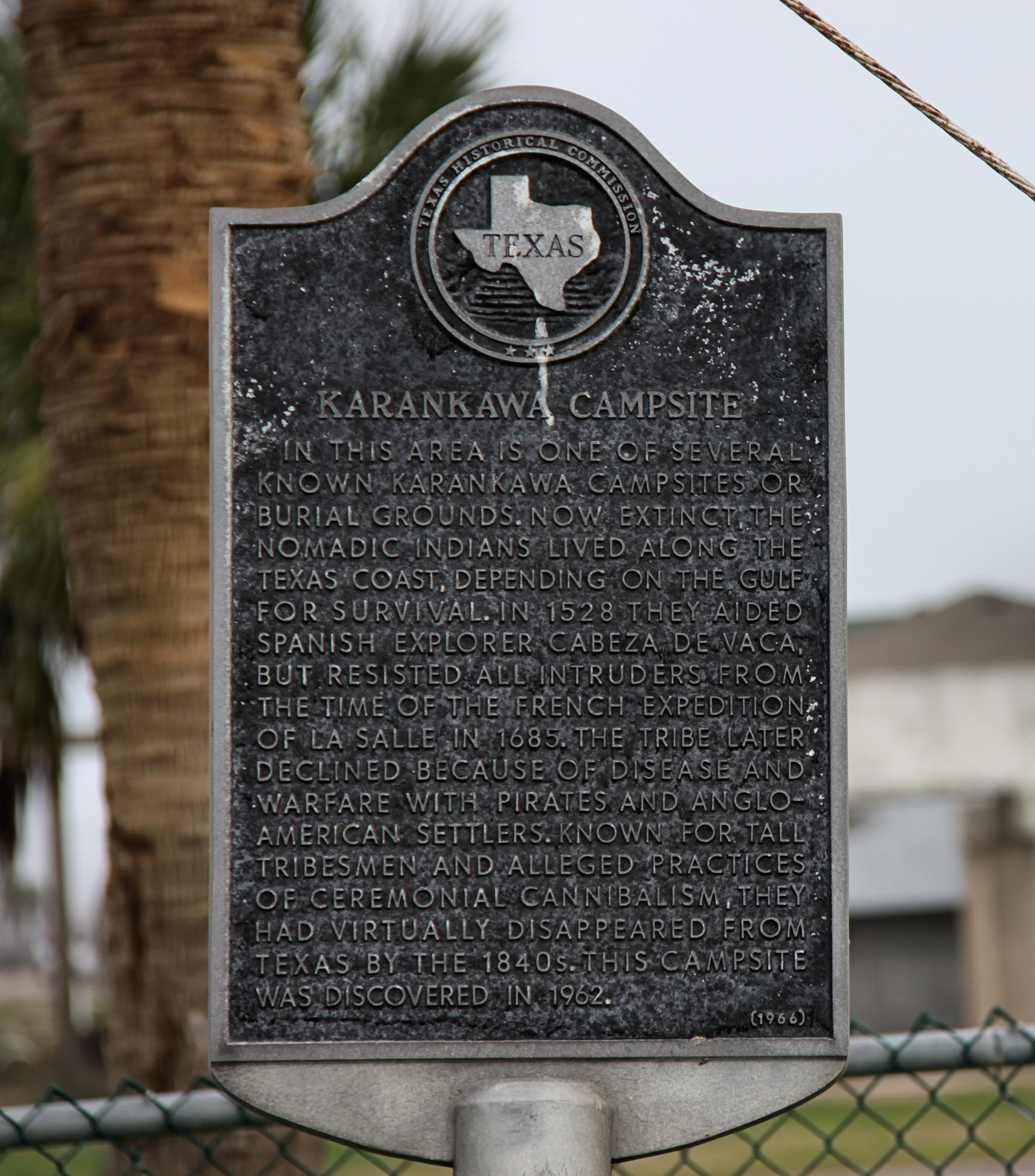
Karankawa Indian campsite and burial ground historical marker located in Jamaica Beach on the west end of Galveston Island

In 1528, one of two barges put together by survivors of the failed Pánfilo de Narváez expedition to Florida struck aground at Galveston Island. Survivors, including Cabeza de Vaca, were cared for by the Capoque band of Karankawa. From 1527, Cabeza de Vaca subsisted for seven years among the coastal tribes, making a living as a medical practitioner and occasional trader. During his stay, de Vaca reported that a fatal stomach ailment reduced the Karankawa population by roughly one half; the nature and casualties resulting from this illness are unknown. De Vaca reported that extensive trade occurred with inland groups as far as the extent of the entire length of the present-day United States. After the introduction of the horse by Spaniards, these trade networks strengthened.

Henri Joutel, the companion of Robert Cavelier de La Salle on his last expedition in 1687, recorded several tribes living in the coastal area, including the Karankawa (which he spelled as Korenkake and Koinekahe). His observations were that the Karankawa were peaceable rather than hostile. Upon their first meeting, Joutel reports that the Karankawa "demonstrated their friendship by putting their hands over their hearts, which meant that they were glad to see us." He also noted that they possessed horses, which were undoubtedly obtained from the Spanish.

When de La Salle stole some canoes from the Karankawa to sail up a river and establish Fort St. Louis, the Karankawas were enraged. When they heard of de La Salle's departure and subsequent death, they attacked about 20 French settlers left in the fort and massacred all but five. The survivors were forcibly tattooed and made to follow the Karankawa on their hunting and fishing expeditions; they were eventually rescued by a Spanish expedition in 1689.

=== Relations with the Spanish ===
The La Salle venture stimulated the Spanish into active exploration and colonization of south Texas. A Spanish search for Fort St. Louis to check if the French had returned led to a skirmish between the Karankawa and the Spanish, and an establishment of hostilities between these two groups.

In 1691, Governor Domingo Terán led a combined land-sea expedition to Texas to strengthen recently established missions and to search for French presence. Both expeditions were mismanaged and led to a temporary lapse in Spanish interest. Continued French action, however, encouraged the Spaniards to occupy the area of Matagorda Bay permanently.

La Bahía del Espiritu Santo, a mission-presidio complex, was established in 1722 near the site of Fort St. Louis. At first, the Karankawa were not antagonistic to the Spanish, but in 1723, a skirmish occurred between the Spanish and Karankawa, after which the Karankawa moved away from the mission and became hostile. By 1727, the Karankawa depredations forced the mission-presidio complex to move inland to the Guadalupe River, where they remained until 1749. The Karankawa successfully weakened the Spanish claim to the Texas coast.

By the 1730s, Spain viewed the Karankawa and other Native American tribes of Texas as obstacles to their control of northern New Spain. In 1749, José de Escandón was made governor and representative of the viceroy, appointed to conquer and settle northern Mexico and the region of Texas, and to map, survey, and acquaint himself with the area and with the natives. He recommended that the mission of La Bahía should be moved because of native hostility and the unfavorable climate.

A new mission, Mission Rosario, was established in 1754. It was in constant fear of revolt by the natives in the mission and often appealed to La Bahía for military aid. Overall, it was extremely ineffective as a spiritual and "civilizing" center. The Karankawa fled when subjected to any corporal punishment, and continued to enjoy the resources provided by the Spanish without being dependent on them.

Over time, the Karankawa grew to speak Spanish with great fluency and adopted Spanish names for themselves to facilitate interaction with the whites.

The late 18th century had a revival of Karankawa resistance and strength. The Spanish began to see them as unable to be converted to mission life, and some began to scheme for their extermination, but none of these schemes was successfully carried out.

In 1779, Spanish officials planned a series of punitive expeditions against the Karankawa in response to Karankawas, led by Joseph Maria, killing of Spanish sailors along the Texas Gulf Coast and later raiding Mission Rosario, which led to the mission's abandonment. These efforts sought to exterminate the Karankawa, but none succeeded. Spain changed its strategy by 1786, with war ended in 1789.

In 1806, the Rosario mission was merged with that of Refugio. In 1830, Refugio and La Bahía del Espiritu Santo were secularized.

=== Relations with the English and the French ===
While the Spanish tried to incorporate the Karankawa into their empire, the Karankawa engaged in purely economic terms with the English and the French, trading skins and deer for weapons (i.e., muskets, guns, cloth) and household goods.

=== Encounters with Jean Lafitte ===
When Galveston Island was occupied by the pirate Jean Lafitte from 1817 to 1821, some of his men kidnapped a Karankawa woman. In response, about 300 Karankawa moved in to attack. When Lafitte learned of their encampment and impending attack, he sent 200 of his men, armed with two cannons, to confront the Karankawa. After the Karankawa lost about 30 men, they retreated to the mainland, with the pirates in pursuit. On the mainland, a few more Karankawa were killed.

=== Encounters with the Texan colonists ===
Painting, The Settlement of Austin's Colony, by Henry Arthur McArdle, in the House of Representatives chamber in the Texas Capitol: Stephen F. Austin is shown rallying his colonists against the Karankawa Indians around 1824, as an unnamed scout comes to the cabin door to sound the alarm.

Moses Austin was introduced to the Karankawas by an encounter with a peaceful Coco tribe. After some talks and an exchange of tobacco and a frying pan, Moses Austin considered them good friends, but after a warning of Karankawas at the mouth of a nearby river, Moses wrote in his journal that Karankawas are universal enemies of man and cannot be befriended and must be exterminated for Anglo-American settlers to live in peace.

In 1821, Moses Austin received the Austin land grant to settle 300 families between Galveston Bay and the Colorado River. The Karankawa sought to hinder their progress by killing settlers who were guarding the ship John Motley and by stealing their supplies. By 1825, settlers banded together to attack the Karankawa. Stephen Austin commissioned Captain Kuykendall to lead volunteers to expel them from the territory, which extended to the Lavaca River. They chased the Karankawa to Manahila Creek, where a Spanish missionary interceded on their behalf and made them promise to never again go east of the Lavaca. This promise was broken, however, and was met by disproportionate violence by the Texan colonists.

=== Genocide of the Karankawa ===
During the Texan-Mexican War, some of the Karankawa served in the Mexican Army. They suffered greatly in the Battle of the Alamo of 1836, and the Texans retaliated heavily for their service.

Chief Jose Maria's 19-year-old son, Walupe, was captured by the Mexicans and killed. His father came on board the ship of a Texan settler and announced his intent of revenge, but the majority of his men and himself were killed. Antonio, who claimed he was the brother of Jose Maria, became chief after that. During his administration and afterward, the Karankawa population diminished significantly from disease, conflict with Europeans, and infighting.

By the 1840s, the Karankawa consisted of two groups; one settled on Padre Island, while the other applied to settle in the Mexican state of Tamaulipas. After being exiled from their homeland, the latter group reportedly plundered and stole; the Mexican government then ordered troops to subdue them. General Avalos was ordered to move the Karankawa to the border of Tamaulipas and Nuevo León. The two states disputed over the Karankawa, and they were eventually returned to Reynosa. After continued robberies, the Karankawa were removed to Texas.

In 1858, the judge of Rosario, Mexico, sent a message to the mayor of Reynosa that he had tried to arrest the Karankawa, but they moved north of the American border beyond his jurisdiction. He added that Mexicans and Americans should work together for the Karankawas' arrest. Later that year, Juan Cortina made a surprise attack on the recently returned Karankawa and annihilated what was believed to be at the time, the last members of the tribe. In a study on the Karankawa published in 1888, one interviewee "thought that some [Karankawa] may be still in existence, but could not tell where." The Karankawa went extinct as a distinct tribe in the late 19th century.

== Heritage groups ==
There are no federally recognized tribes or state-recognized tribes of Karankawa people

As of 2021, a group of individuals who claim descent from the Karankawa people formed the Karankawa Kadla. This organization is an unrecognized organization. Members of the Karankawa Kadla split from the group and formed the Karankawa Tribe of Texas, another unrecognized organization.

== Tribes ==
Tribes within the Karankawa include:

- the Copano people
- the Cujane (Note: Alternate spellings include: Cojane, Cujana, Cuxane, Cohanni, Coxane, Cujano, Guyane, Kohani, Qujane, Quxane.)
- the Coco (Note: Alternate spellings include: Caaucozi, Caocasi, Cascossi, Coke, Quaqui, Quoaque.)
