= Zaragoza Birthplace State Historic Site =

State park in the U.S. state of Texas

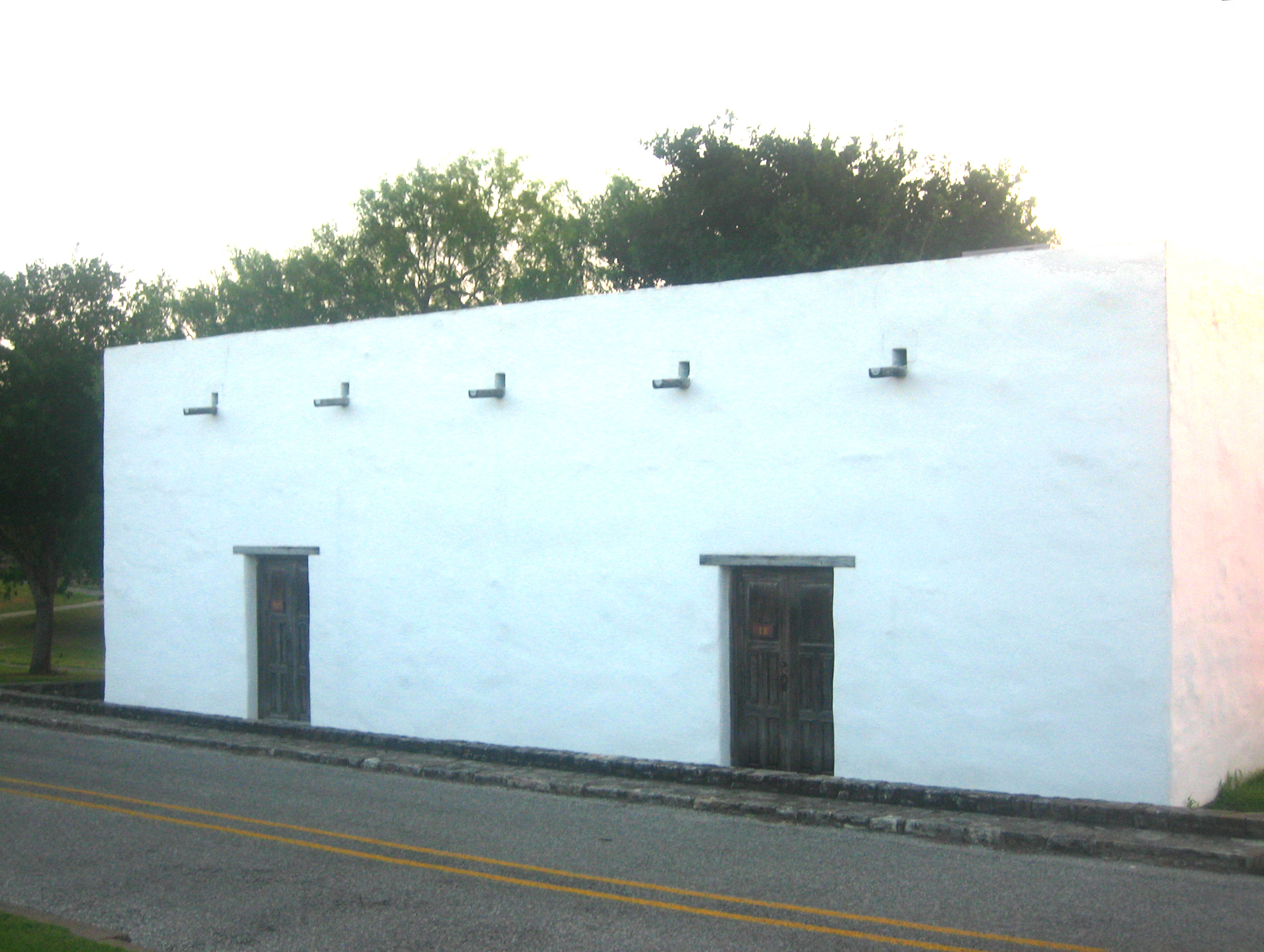

- Location within Texas Location within the United States
- Location: Goliad County, USA
- Nearest city: Goliad, Texas
- Coordinates: 28°38′53″N 97°22′55″W
- Area: 3 acres (1.2 ha)
- Established: 1976
- Governing body: Texas Parks and Wildlife Department

The Zaragoza Birthplace State Historic Park is an historic site located adjacent to Presidio La Bahía in Goliad State Park and Historic Site, Goliad County, in the U.S. state of Texas. It marks the birthplace of General Ignacio Zaragoza, a hero of the 1862 Battle of Puebla. An amphitheater and a bronze statue of Zaragoza are also on the grounds.

== General Zaragoza ==
Ignacio Zaragoza was a hero of the Battle of Puebla, which is commemorated each year by Cinco de Mayo celebrations. On May 5, 1862, General Zaragoza and 600 of his forces repelled 6,500 French forces in the city of Puebla, and prevented a French invasion into Mexico.

== The house ==
Zaragoza was born in Goliad at this site on March 24, 1829. In September 1961, the county of Goliad donated 3 acres (1.2 ha) at Zaragoza's birth site for a memorial in his honor. The Texas Parks and Wildlife Department reconstructed his birth home on the foundation. Architectural plans were drawn up for the Parks Department by Raiford Stripling of San Augustine. Stein Lumber Company of Fredericksburg completed construction in December 1974. The birthplace was opened to the public on the 114th anniversary of Cinco de Mayo, May 5, 1976. The site also includes an amphitheater.

A 10-foot (3.0 m) bronze statue to commemorate Zaragoza was donated by the people of Puebla, Mexico and unveiled on September 13, 1980. It is located on the grounds of the birthplace in front of the amphitheater.

== Facilities, hours, and admission ==
Goliad State Park is open 7 days a week. Entrance fees apply. The Zaragoza house is located outside the park grounds about one mile south of the entrance to Goliad State Park. Group tours need to be arranged in advance.

The Texas State Park Store gift shop is located on Goliad park grounds. Goliad State Park facilities also contain restrooms, a museum, and a playground.

== See also ==
- Museums in the Texas Gulf Coast
- National Register of Historic Places listings in Goliad County, Texas
