= Berclair Mansion =

Coordinates: 28°32′00″N 97°35′29″W

The Berclair Mansion was built in 1936. It is a 22-room, 10,000-square-foot (930 m^{2}) mansion located in Berclair, Texas (between Goliad and Beeville, Texas). It is considered the largest steel strand house in the US, constructed with over 60 tons of concrete and steel.

The mansion was built by Etta Terrell and she resided there with her four sisters until her death. Etta employed Cowell & Weaver Inc. of Corpus Christi, Texas to build and construction of the home cost $57,525. Today, that would be just under $1,000,000. When Etta was a child, her home was destroyed in a fire, giving her the inspiration to build a home that would essentially be fireproof. The Berclair Mansion was originally furnished with unique pieces from all over the world, as well as a few items from Etta's family home that had burned in a fire. The house still retains all of its original furnishing and tours are offered the last Sunday of every month. According to ghost hunting organizations, the mansion is allegedly haunted. The house is owned and operated by the Beeville Art Association.
