= Erath Memorial Arch =

- Erath Memorial
- U.S. National Register of Historic Places
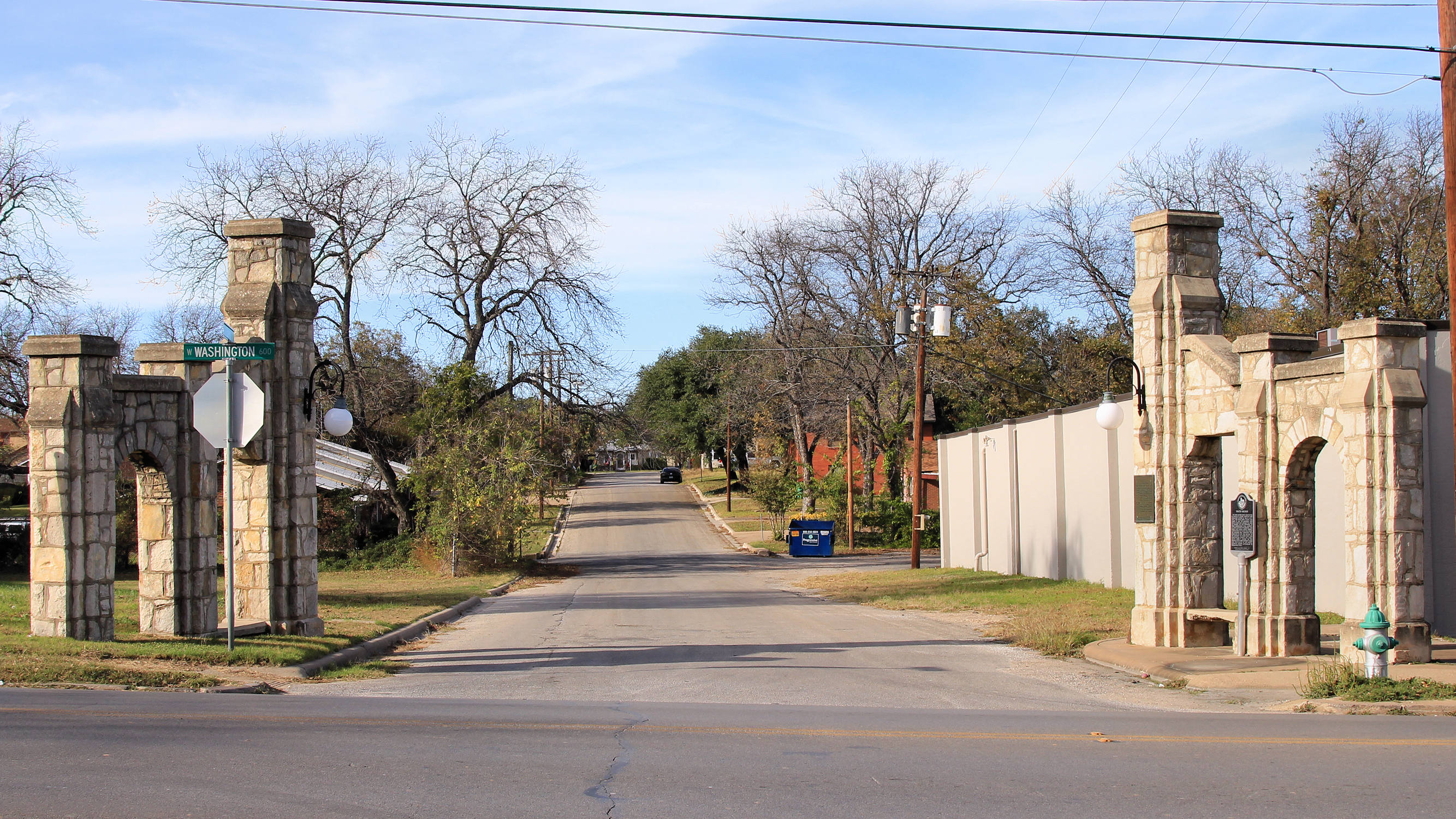

- Location within Texas Location within the United States
- Location: N Erath Ave. & W Washington St., Stephenville, Texas
- Coordinates: 32.218923°N 98.205814°W
- Area: less than one acre
- Built: 1936
- MPS: Monuments and Buildings of the Texas Centennial MPS
- NRHP reference No.: 100002348
- Added to NRHP: April 19, 2018

The Erath Memorial Arch, in Stephenville, Texas, was listed on the National Register of Historic Places in 2018.

It is not an arch, but rather is a two-part stone gate, built in 1936 as part of celebration of the Texas Centennial.

It is located at N. Erath Ave. & W. Washington St. in Stephenville.

It was designed by local architect C.V. Head and was carved by Dublin, Texas rock mason Arthur Maxwell.
