= Matagorda County Monument =

- U.S. National Register of Historic Places
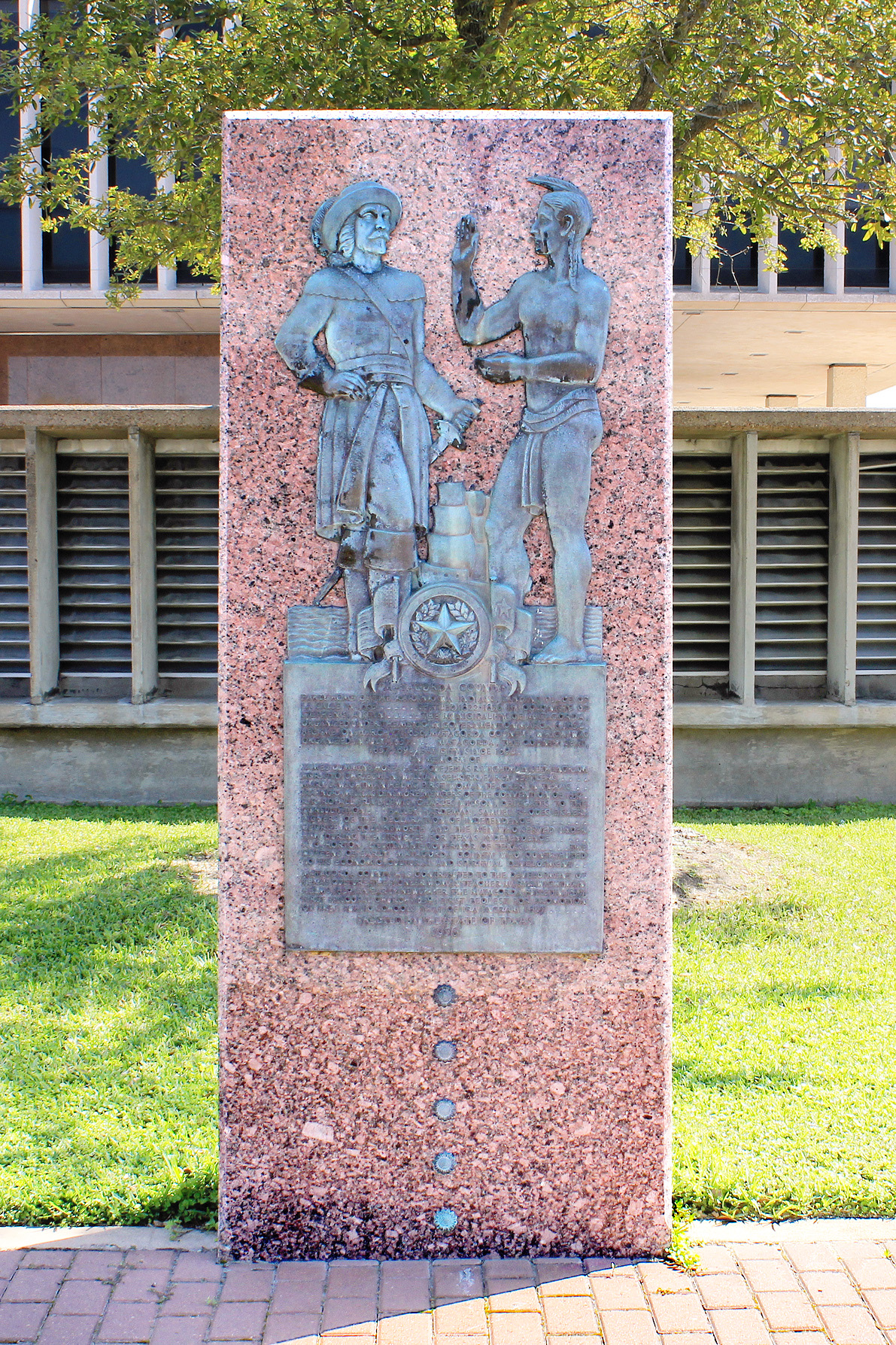

- Location within Texas Location within the United States
- Location: 1700 7th St., Bay City, Texas
- Coordinates: 28°58′58″N 95°58′11″W
- Area: less than one acre
- Built: 1937
- MPS: Monuments and Buildings of the Texas Centennial MPS
- NRHP reference No.: 100002351
- Added to NRHP: April 19, 2018

The Matagorda County Monument, in Bay City, Texas, was listed on the National Register of Historic Places in 2018.

It was designed by architects Page & Southerland and sculptor Raoul Josset.
