= Goliad State Park and Historic Site =

State park and historic site in Texas, United States

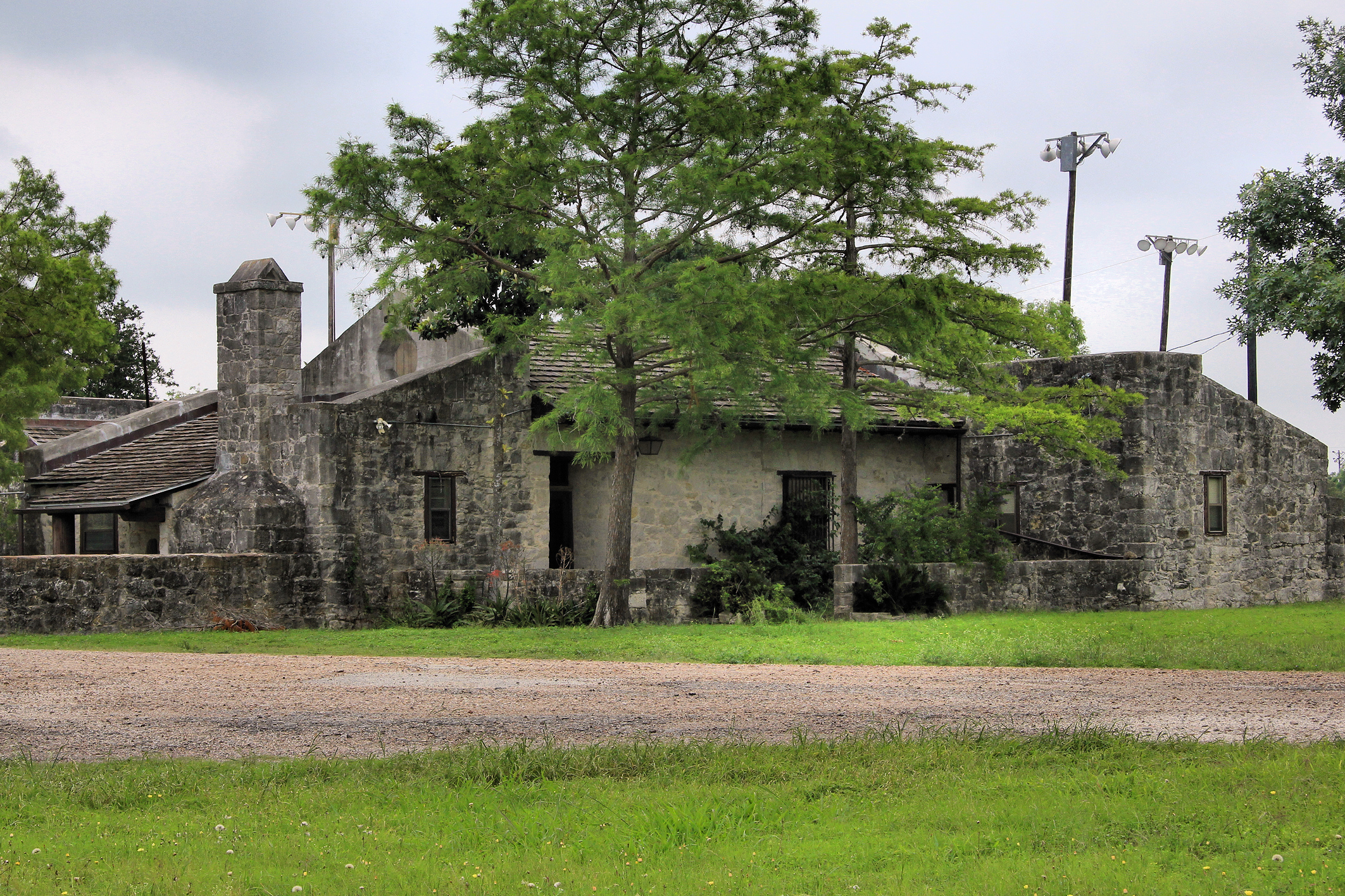
- Former custodian's house for Goliad State Park. Built by the Civilian Conservation Corps circa 1936

- Location within Texas Location within the United States
- Location: US 183 at San Antonio River, Goliad, Texas
- Coordinates: 28°39′24″N 97°23′14″W
- Area: 188.3 acres (76.2 ha)
- Established: 1936
- Visitors: 47,517 (in 2025)
- Governing body: Texas Parks and Wildlife Department
- Website: Official site
- Goliad State Park Historic District
- U.S. National Register of Historic Places
- U.S. Historic district
- Texas State Historic Site
- Area: 276 acres (112 ha)
- Built: 1931
- Architect: Atlee Bernard Ayres, Samuel Phelps Vosper, et al.
- Architectural style: Colonial Revival, Moderne, NPS Rustic
- NRHP reference No.: 01000258

Significant dates
- Added to NRHP: March 12, 2001
- Designated TSHS: 1936

Goliad State Park and Historic Site is a 276 acres (112 ha) state park located along the San Antonio River on the southern edge of Goliad, Texas, United States. It was listed on the National Register of Historic Places (#01000258) on March 12, 2001. It is managed by the Texas Parks and Wildlife Department.

== Park ==
The 188.3-acre (76.2 ha) main park features campsites, screened shelters, group hall, amphitheater and a reconstruction of Mission Nuestra Señora del Espíritu Santo de Zúñiga (commonly known as Mission Espíritu Santo). The El Camino Real de los Tejas Visitors Center, Zaragoza Birthplace State Historic Site and ruins of Mission Nuestra Señora del Rosario are separate outlying units of the park.

== Nature ==
=== Plants ===
American sycamore, pecan, cedar elm, and red mulberry grow along the San Antonio River. Honey mesquite and anacua are in the drier areas of the park. The Goliad Anacua is a historic, large anacua tree located near the entrance of Mission Espíritu Santo. The tree is estimated to be nearly two centuries old.

=== Animals ===
Mammals include White-tailed deer, eastern fox squirrel, Mexican long-nosed armadillo, collared peccary, gray fox, ringtail, and bobcat. The park has many colonies of leafcutter ant. Reptiles include Texas spiny lizard, green anole, common spotted whiptail, red-eared slider and coachwhip.

== See also ==
- List of Texas state parks
- List of Texas State Historic Sites
- National Register of Historic Places listings in Goliad County, Texas
- Recorded Texas Historic Landmarks in Goliad County
