= Mission-Aransas National Estuarine Research Reserve =

Preserve complex in Texas, United States

Coordinates: 28.058953°N 97.067385°W

The Mission-Aransas National Estuarine Research Reserve is a large contiguous complex of wetland, terrestrial, and marine environments on the Texas Coastal Bend in the United States. Named for the two major rivers that flow into the area, the reserve contains public and private lands and waters. The land is primarily coastal prairie with unique oak motte habitats. The wetlands include riparian habitat, freshwater marshes, and saltwater marshes. Within the water areas, the bays are large, open, and include extensive tidal flats, seagrass meadows, mangroves, and oyster reefs. These unique and diverse estuarine habitats in the western Gulf of Mexico support a host of endangered and threatened species including the endangered whooping crane.

Traditional activities within the reserve include boating, fishing, hunting, oil and gas extraction, shellfish harvesting, camping and recreational activities. Despite a long history of human uses and its close proximity to the city of Corpus Christi, the reserve is relatively rural and pristine.

== Visitor facilities ==
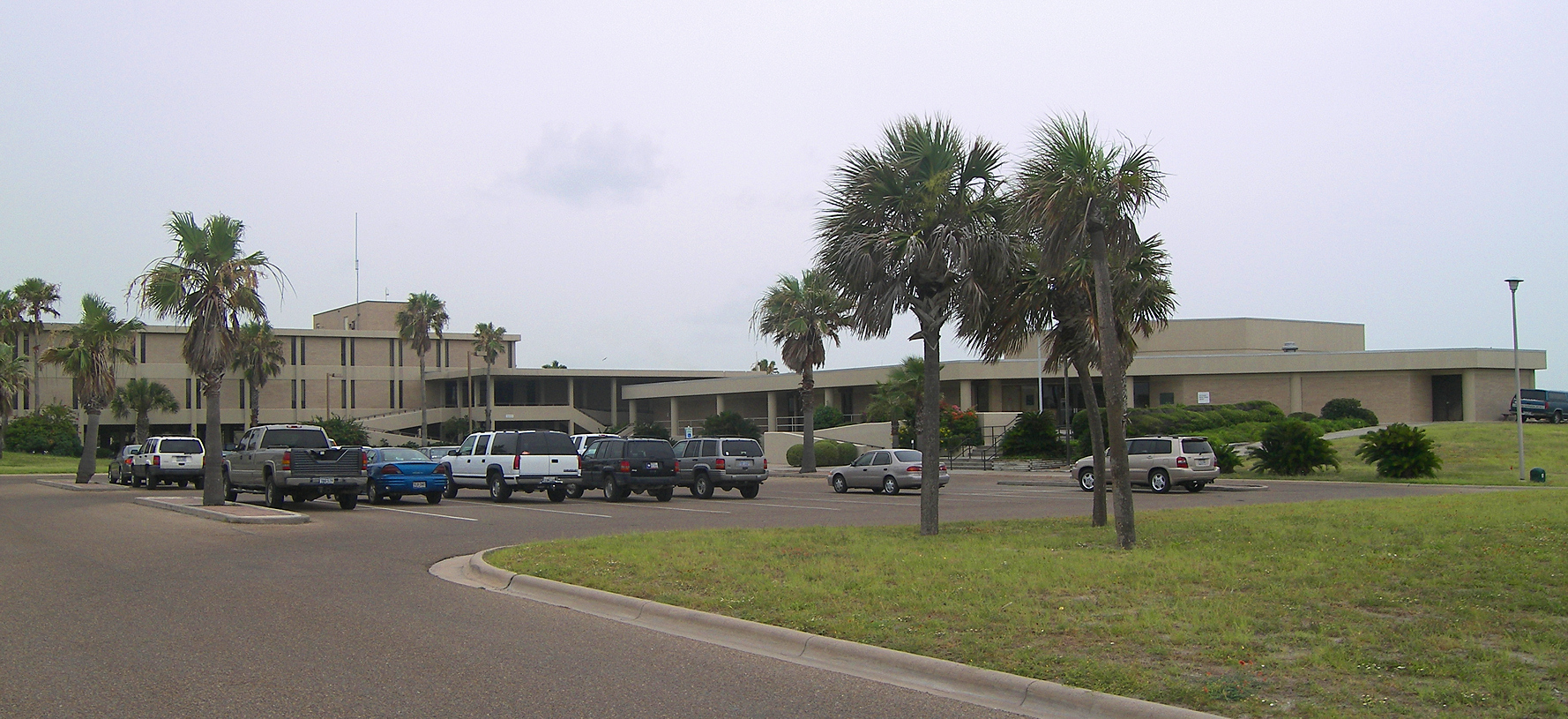
University of Texas Marine Science Institute in Port Aransas, Texas

The University of Texas Marine Science Institute operates locations for visitors to learn about and explore the reserve.

- The University of Texas Marine Science Institute Visitor Center is now known as the Patton Marine Science Education Center and is located in Port Aransas. It features several aquaria representing typical Texas coastal habitats, self guided tours and educational movies. The facility also includes a gift cart. The education department also offers school trips on the R/V Katy, a research vessel.
- The Wetlands Education Center is located in Port Aransas and is an artificial wetlands seagrass pond that occupies 3.5 acres between the MSI Visitors Center (PMSEC) and the South Jetty. Visitors can tour a boardwalk around the pond to view the vegetation and the wildlife, and view educational signage.
- The Bay Education Center is located in Rockport, Texas, and features exhibits about the estuary's ecosystem and Science On a Sphere, a spherical display system created by NOAA to illustrate Earth science concepts.
- Fennessey Ranch is located near Bayside, Texas, and is managed by the reserve.
- The Amos Rehabilitation Keep (ARK) is located in Port Aransas, Texas, and is perhaps the most well-known and famous division of the reserve. This department is the face of MSI and reserve outreach and connects the community with the institute. The primary mission of the Amos Rehabilitation Keep (or ARK) is to rescue and rehabilitate sick and injured birds, sea turtles, terrestrial turtles, and tortoises found along the South Texas coast and to return them to their native habitat. The ARK performs turtle releases throughout the year when turtles are ready to be released. These events are open to the public, free of charge, and very popular within the community. The ARK was founded by Tony Amos and is one of the original and largest wildlife rehabilitation facilities in the area, relying on a small staff and a large team of volunteers.
- Volunteering - the Reserve relies on a large number of volunteers.
