= Berclair, Texas =

- Unincorporated community
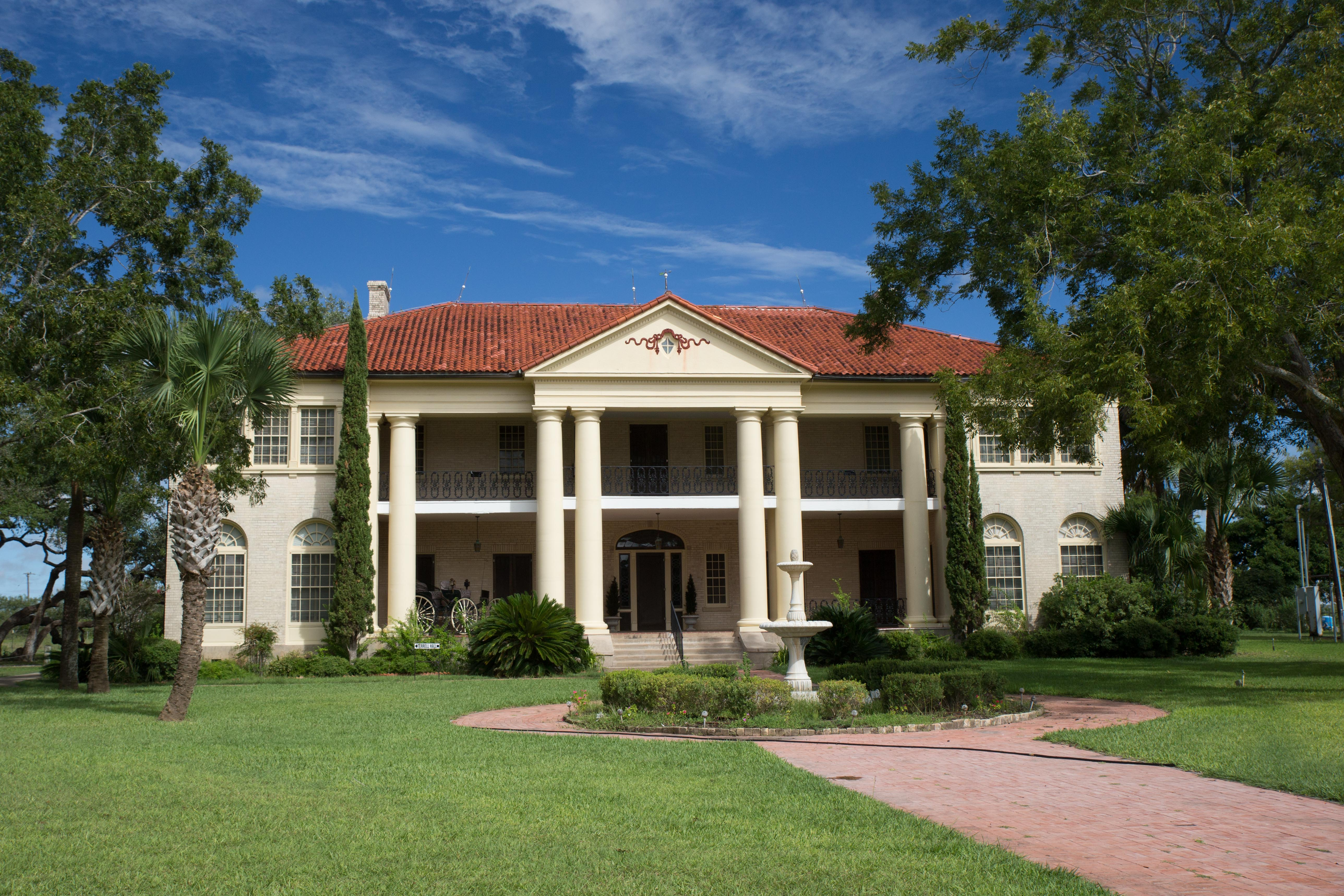
- Berclair Mansion

- Location within Texas Location within the United States
- Coordinates: 28°31′51″N 97°35′28″W
- Country: United States
- State: Texas
- County: Goliad
- Elevation: 190 ft (58 m)

Population (2000)
  - Total: 253
- Time zone: UTC-6 (Central (CST))
  - Summer (DST): UTC-5 (CDT)
- Area code: 361

Berclair is an unincorporated community in Goliad County, Texas, United States. It is part of the Victoria, Texas Metropolitan Statistical Area.

== History ==
Berclair was founded in 1889 when the railroad was extended to that point. The town's name is an amalgamation of Bert and Clair Lucas, the names of local ranchers.

== See also ==
- Berclair Mansion
