= Fannin Battleground State Historic Site =

Coordinates: 28°41′11″N 97°14′2″W

- U.S. National Register of Historic Places
- U.S. Historic district
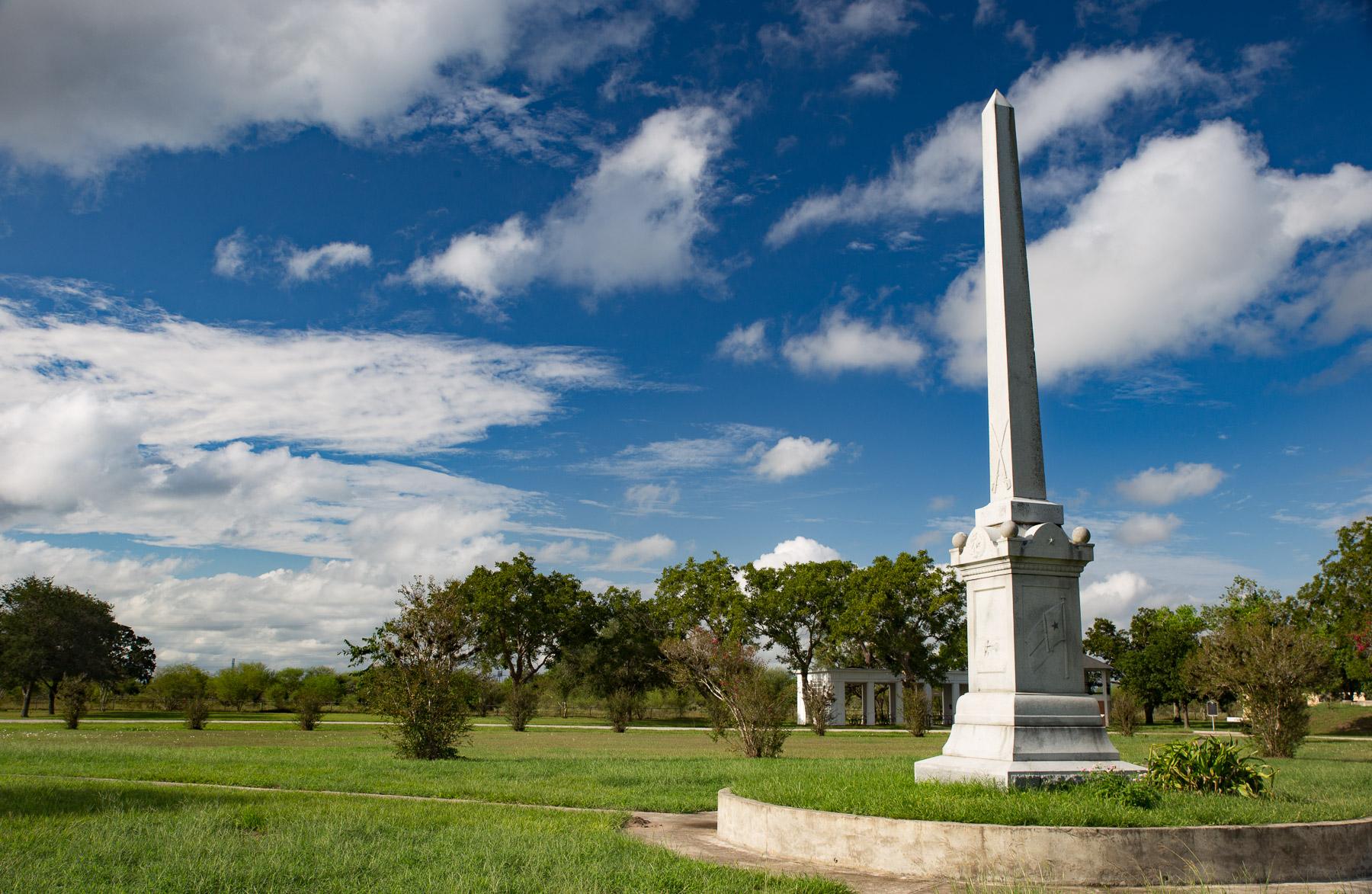
- Fannin Battleground State Historic Site in 2018

- Location within Texas Location within the United States
- Location: 734 FM 2506, Fannin, Texas
- Website: Fannin Battleground State Historic Site
- NRHP reference No.: 100000695
- Added to NRHP: February 28, 2017

The Fannin Battleground State Historic Site commemorates the Battle of Coleto Creek, a battle of the Texas Revolution, fought on March 19 and 20, 1836 between Texian forces commanded by Col. James W. Fannin and the Mexican Army commanded by Mexican General Jose de Urrea. Eventually surrounded and outnumbered, Fannin surrendered to the Mexican Army. He and his troops were executed several days later at nearby Presidio La Bahia.

Fannin Battleground State Historic Site is located east of Goliad in Goliad County, Texas. The citizens of Goliad County donated the 14-acre battleground to the State of Texas around 1913. The state originally named it Fannin State Park. The site is currently operated by the Texas Historical Commission and features a stone obelisk, interpretive exhibit, group pavilion, and picnic area.

== See also ==
- List of Texas state historic sites
- National Register of Historic Places listings in Goliad County, Texas
- Recorded Texas Historic Landmarks in Goliad County
