= Mission Nuestra Señora del Rosario =

Historical Spanish mission in Texas

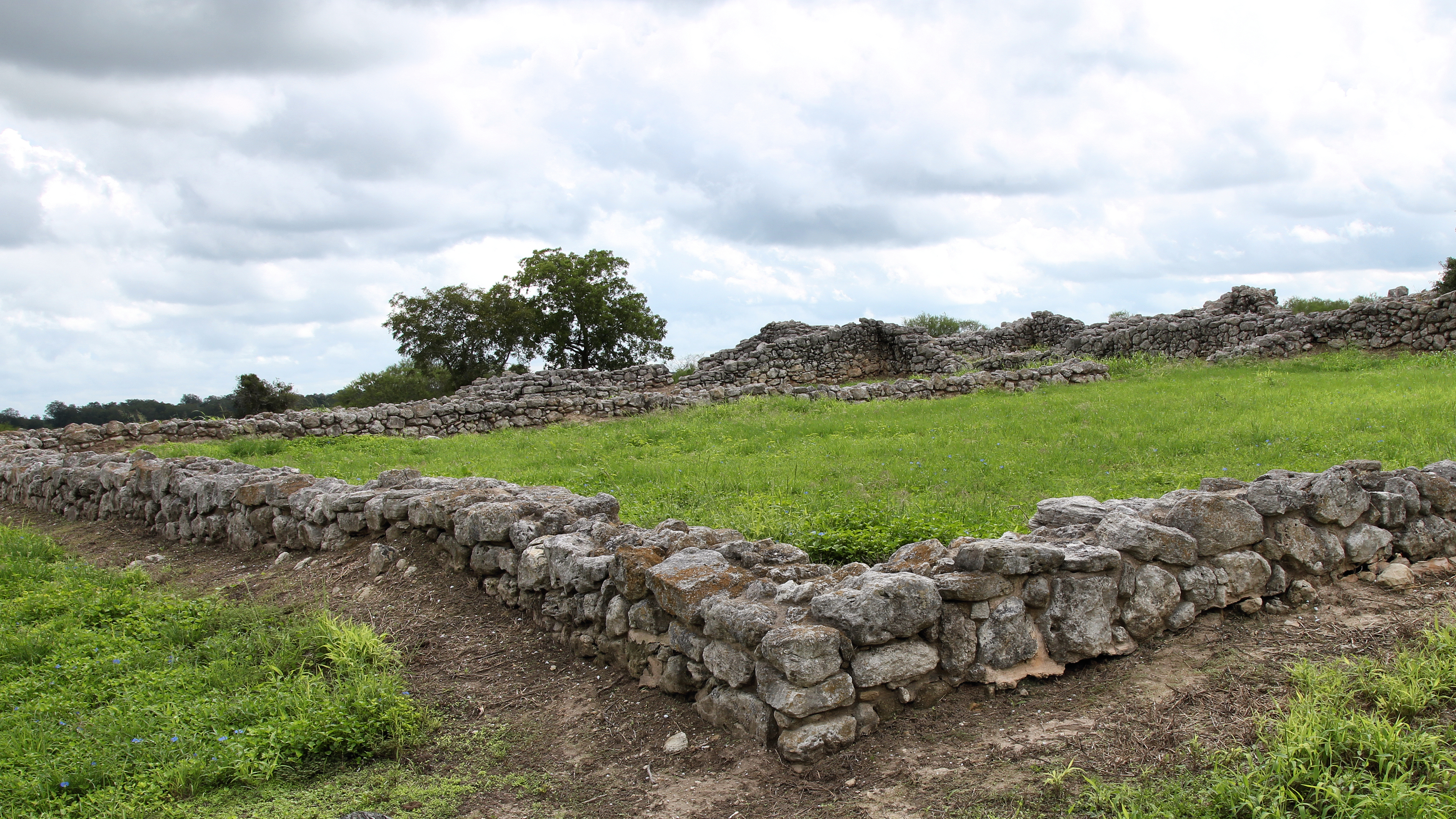
- The ruins of Mission Nuestra Señora del Rosario

- Location within Texas Location within the United States

Religion
- Affiliation: Roman Catholic

Location
- Location: Goliad County, Texas; USA
- Coordinates: 28°38′40″N 97°26′20″W

Architecture
- Style: Spanish Colonial
- Established: 1754

Specifications
- Site area: 5 acres (2.0 ha)
- Materials: stone and mortar

U.S. National Register of Historic Places
- Added to NRHP: September 22, 1972
- NRHP Reference no.: 72001363

Mission Nuestra Señora del Rosario de los Cujanes was established in November 1754 by Spanish Franciscan missionary Father Juan de Dios Camberos to bring Christianity to the indigenous Karankawa people. At its peak, the mission owned a herd of 5,000 cattle, but mismanagement, lack of administrative support and resistance from the Karankawa led to the gradual decline of the mission.

At the mission, the Karankawa were expected to adhere to a schedule of religious instruction, technical education and manual labor, however, few Karankawa would abandon their religion and culture and left the mission.

The architectural details of Mission Rosario are lost, but archaeologists believe the building consisted of a chapel, sacristy, bell tower and residence. Soldiers from nearby Presidio La Bahía most likely guarded the mission to protect it from threats.
