= Fannin, Texas =

- Unincorporated community
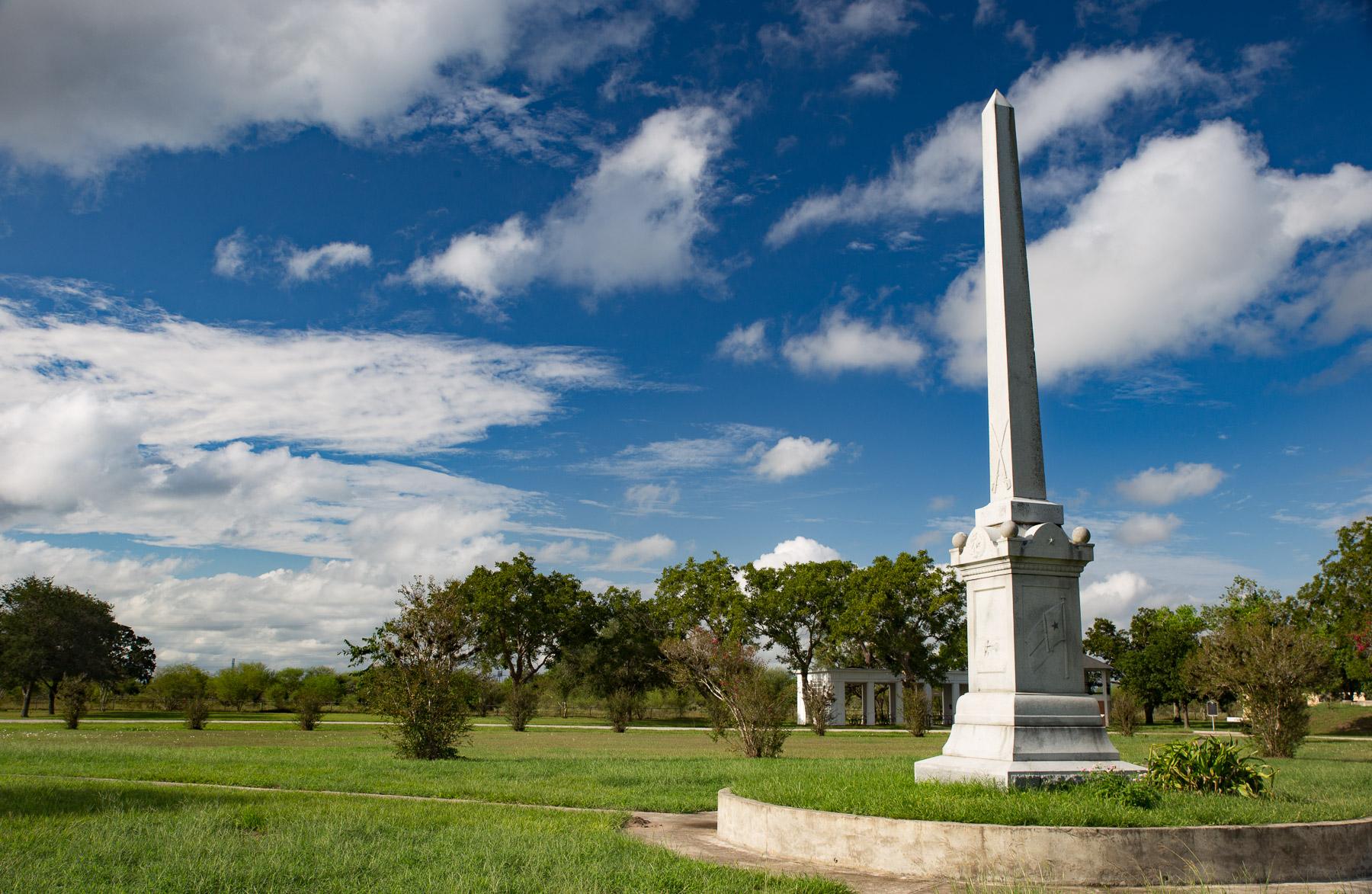
- Fannin Battleground State Historic Site

- Location within Texas Location within the United States
- Coordinates: 28°41′44″N 97°14′9″W
- Country: United States
- State: Texas
- County: Goliad
- Elevation: 141 ft (43 m)
- Time zone: UTC-6 (Central (CST))
  - Summer (DST): UTC-5 (CDT)
- GNIS feature ID: 1373703

Fannin is an unincorporated community in eastern Goliad County, Texas, United States. Its elevation is 141 feet (43 m). It is part of the Victoria, Texas Metropolitan Statistical Area.

== History ==
Fannin is named for James Fannin, who commanded the group of Texans killed in the Goliad Massacre during the Texas Revolution.

== Recreation ==
Fannin is home to the Coleto Creek Reservoir. It is a venue for camping, fishing and other outdoor recreational activities.
