= Pearl City (disambiguation) =

Pearl City is a census-designated place in Hawaii, United States.

Pearl City may also refer to:

- Pearl City (Boca Raton), a neighborhood in Florida
- Pearl City, Illinois, a village
- Pearl City, Texas, an unincorporated community
- Pearl City, municipal seat of Pearl Lagoon, Nicaragua

== See also ==
- Pearl City High School (disambiguation)
- City of Pearl, a 2004 science fiction novel by English author Karen Traviss
- Pearl, Mississippi, a city in the United States
- Pearl (disambiguation)
