= Westhoff =

Westhoff may refer to:

- Westhoff Independent School District, public school district based in the community of Westhoff, Texas
- Westhoff, Texas, community in Texas

== People with the surname ==
- Clara Westhoff (1878–1954), German sculptor
- Felipe Westhoff, German-Lithuanian immigrant to Chile and founder of Melinka
- Johann Paul von Westhoff (1656–1705), German Baroque composer and violinist
- Justin Westhoff, Australian footballer
- Matthew Westhoff, Australian footballer, brother of aforementioned Justin
- Mike Westhoff, special teams coach for the New York Jets
- Victor Westhoff (1916–2001), Dutch botanist
