= Golly, Texas =

Coordinates: 28°56′37″N 97°15′42″W

Golly of Golly Community is a ghost town in De Witt County, Texas, United States. In 2000, the population was 41
