= Roy Benavidez =

US Army Special Forces member and Army sergeant

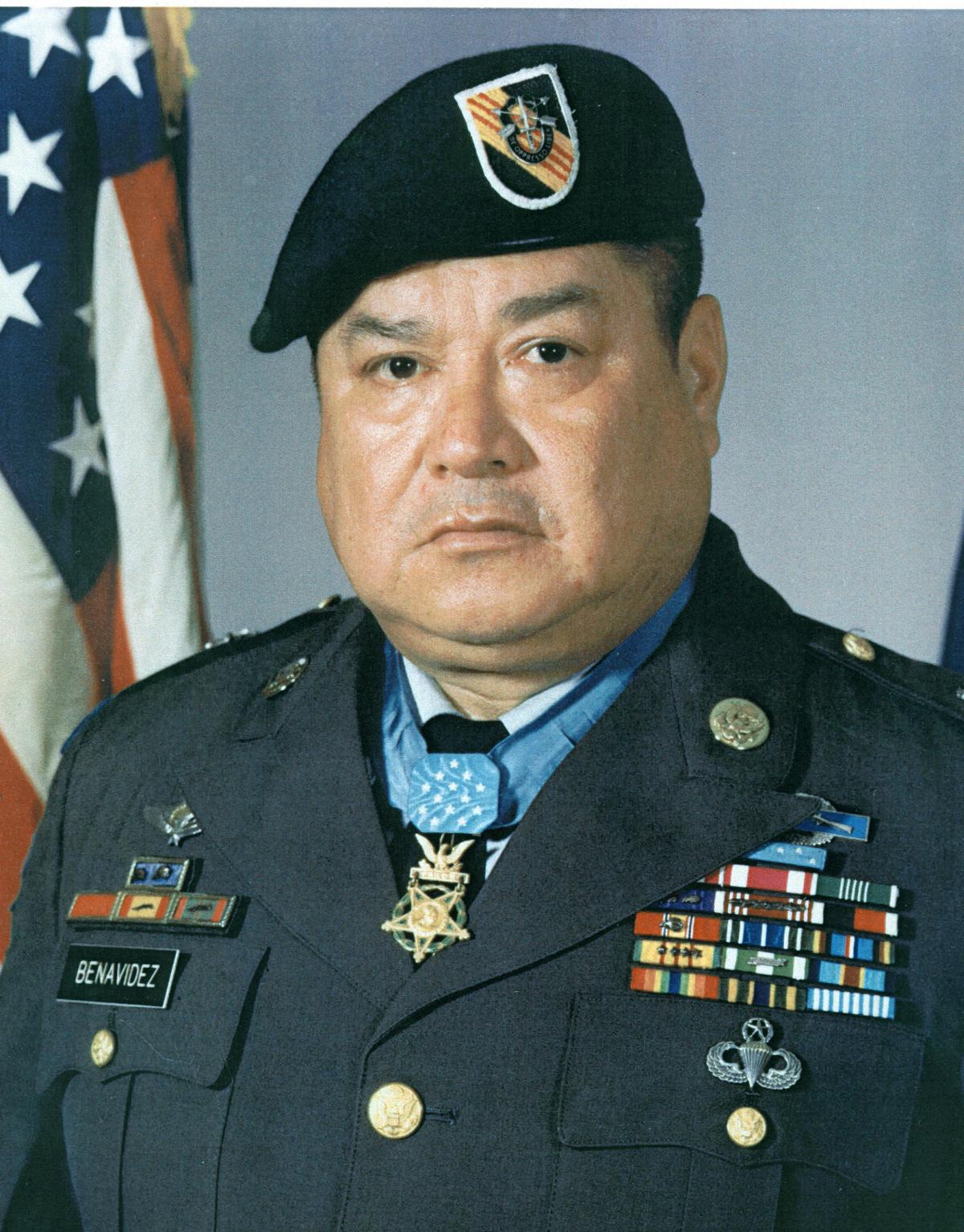
- Master Sergeant Roy Benavidez after February 1981
- Born: August 5, 1935; Lindenau, Texas, U.S.
- Died: November 29, 1998 (aged 63); San Antonio, Texas, U.S.
- Burial place: Fort Sam Houston National Cemetery, San Antonio, Texas
- Military career
- Allegiance: United States
- Branch: United States Army
- Service years: 1952–1976
- Rank: Master Sergeant
- Units: 82nd Airborne Division; 5th Special Forces Group; Military Assistance Command, Vietnam Studies and Observations Group
- Conflicts: Korean War; Vietnam War
- Awards: Medal of Honor; Purple Heart (6); Defense Meritorious Service Medal; Meritorious Service Medal; Army Commendation Medal; Texas Legislative Medal of Honor

Master Sergeant Raul Perez "Roy" Benavidez (August 5, 1935 – November 29, 1998) was a United States Army soldier who was awarded the Medal of Honor for his valorous actions in combat near Lộc Ninh, South Vietnam on May 2, 1968, while serving as a member of the United States Army Special Forces during the Vietnam War.

== Childhood and early life ==
Roy P. Benavidez was born in Lindenau near Cuero, Texas, in DeWitt County. He is a descendant of the founders of Benavides, Texas, and was the son of a Mexican farmer, Salvador Benavidez Jr. and a Yaqui mother, Teresa Perez.

When he was two years old, his father died of tuberculosis and his mother remarried. Five years later, his mother died from tuberculosis as well. Benavidez and his younger brother Roger moved to El Campo, where their grandfather, uncle and aunt raised them along with eight cousins.

Benavidez shined shoes at the local bus station, labored on farms in Texas, New Mexico, and Colorado, and worked at a tire shop in El Campo. He dropped out of school at age 15, in order to work full-time to help support the family.

== Military career ==
=== U.S Army ===
Benavidez enlisted in the Texas Army National Guard in 1952 during the Korean War. In June 1955, he switched from the Army National Guard to Army active duty. In 1959, he married Hilaria "Lala" Coy, completed Airborne training, and was assigned to the 82nd Airborne Division at Fort Bragg, North Carolina.

=== Army Special Forces ===
Benavidez returned to Fort Bragg and began training for the elite Army Special Forces. Once qualified and accepted, he became a member of the 5th Special Forces Group; and the Studies and Observations Group (SOG).

==== Vietnam ====
In 1965, he was sent to South Vietnam as a Special Forces advisor to an Army of the Republic of Vietnam infantry regiment. During his tour of duty, he went on a solo reconnaissance mission to gather Intel on the enemy troops. It was at this moment that he stepped on a land mine (Note: It is alternatively reported that it may have been a grenade thrown at the back of him.) during a patrol and was evacuated to the United States. Doctors at Fort Sam Houston concluded he would never walk again and began preparing his medical discharge papers. As Benavidez noted in his MOH acceptance speech in 1981, stung by the diagnosis, as well as flag burnings and media criticism of the US military presence in Vietnam he saw on TV, he began an unsanctioned nightly training ritual in an attempt to redevelop his ability to walk.

Getting out of bed at night (against doctors' orders), Benavidez would crawl using his elbows and chin to a wall near his bedside and (with the encouragement of his fellow patients, many of whom were permanently paralyzed and/or missing limbs) he would prop himself against the wall and attempt to lift himself unaided, starting by wiggling his toes, then his feet, and then eventually (after several months of excruciating practice that, by his own admission, often left him in tears) pushing himself up the wall with his ankles and legs. After over a year of hospitalization, Benavidez walked out of the hospital in July 1966, with his wife at his side, determined to return to combat in Vietnam. Despite continuing pain from his wounds, he returned to South Vietnam in January 1968.

==== "Six Hours in Hell" ====
On May 2, 1968, a 12-man Special Forces patrol, which included nine Montagnard tribesmen, was surrounded by an NVA infantry battalion of about 1,000 men. Benavidez heard the radio appeal for help and boarded a helicopter to respond. Armed only with a knife, he jumped from the helicopter which was 30–40 ft off the ground, carrying his medical bag and ran to help the trapped patrol. Benavidez "distinguished himself by a series of daring and extremely valorous actions... and because of his gallant choice to join voluntarily his comrades who were in critical straits, to expose himself constantly to withering enemy fire, and his refusal to be stopped despite numerous severe wounds, saved the lives of at least eight men."

At one point in the battle an NVA soldier accosted him and stabbed him with his bayonet. Benavidez pulled it out, drew his own knife, killed him and kept going, leaving his knife in the NVA soldier's body. He later killed two more NVA soldiers with an AK-47 while providing cover fire for the people boarding the helicopter. After the battle, he was evacuated to the base camp, examined, and thought to be dead. As he was placed in a body bag among the other dead in body bags, he was suddenly recognized by a friend who called for help. A doctor came and examined him but believed Benavidez was dead. The doctor was about to zip up the body bag when Benavidez managed to spit in his face to show that he was alive. Benavidez had a total of 37 separate bullet, bayonet, and shrapnel wounds from the six-hour fight with the enemy battalion.

Benavidez was evacuated once again to Fort Sam Houston's Brooke Army Medical Center, where he eventually recovered. He received the Distinguished Service Cross for extraordinary heroism and four Purple Hearts. In 1969, he was assigned to Fort Riley, Kansas. In 1972, he was assigned to Fort Sam Houston, Texas, where he remained until retirement.

== Medal of Honor ==
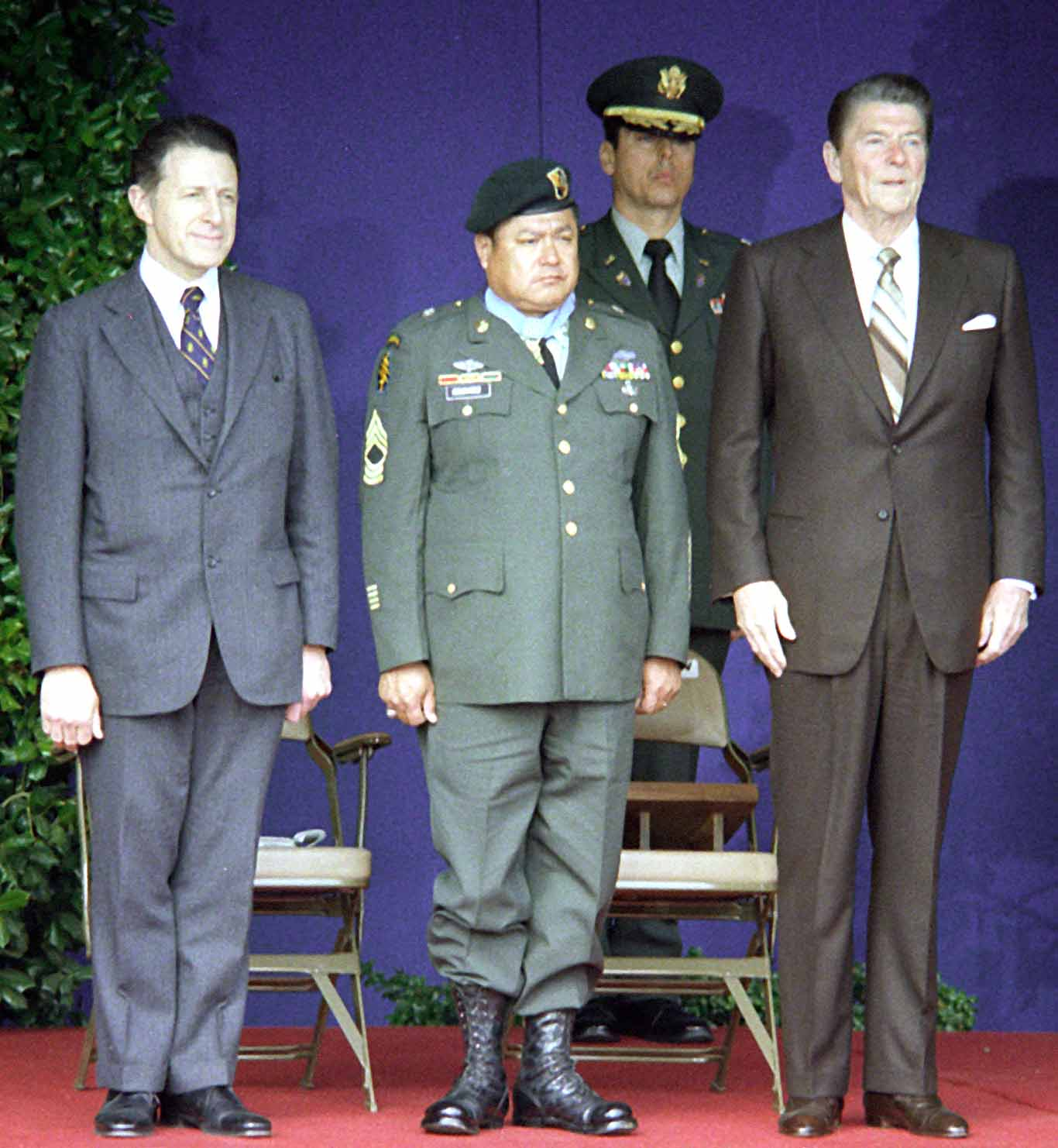
Army Master Sgt. Roy P. Benavidez (center) is flanked by United States Secretary of Defense Caspar Weinberger (left) and US President Ronald Reagan at his Medal of Honor presentation ceremony in 1981.

In 1973, after more detailed accounts became available, Special Forces Lieutenant Colonel Ralph R. Drake insisted that Benavidez receive the Medal of Honor. By then, however, the time limit on the medal had expired. An appeal to Congress resulted in an exemption for Benavidez, but the Army Decorations Board denied him an upgrade of his Distinguished Service Cross to the Medal of Honor. The Army required an eyewitness account from someone present during the action; Benavidez believed that there were no living witnesses of the events of that day, which by then had become known as "Six Hours in Hell".

Unbeknownst to Benavidez, there was a living witness, who would later provide the eyewitness account necessary: Brian O'Connor, the former radioman of Benavidez's Special Forces team in Vietnam. O'Connor had been severely wounded (Benavidez had believed him dead), and he was evacuated to the United States before his superiors could fully debrief him. O'Connor had been living in the Fiji Islands when, in 1980, he was on holiday in Australia. During his holiday, O'Connor read a newspaper account of Benavidez originally from an El Campo newspaper, which had been picked up by the international press and reprinted in Australia. O'Connor immediately contacted Benavidez and submitted a ten-page report of the encounter, confirming the accounts provided by others, and serving as the necessary eyewitness. Benavidez's Distinguished Service Cross accordingly was upgraded to the Medal of Honor.

On February 24, 1981, US President Ronald Reagan presented Roy P. Benavidez with the Medal of Honor in the Pentagon. Reagan turned to the press and said, "If the story of his heroism were a movie script, you would not believe it."

== Post-military retirement ==
In 1976, Benavidez, his wife, and their three children returned home to El Campo, Texas. He devoted his remaining years to the youth of America, speaking to them about the importance of staying in school and getting an education. His message was simple: "An education is the key to success. Bad habits and bad company will ruin you."

In 1983, Benavidez told the press that the Social Security Administration planned to cut off disability payments he had been receiving since his retirement, as well as the disability payments for thousands of other veterans. He went to Capitol Hill and pleaded with the House Select Committee on Aging to abandon their plans, which they finally did.

Speaker

Benavidez was in demand as a speaker by United States armed forces, schools, military and civic groups, and private businesses. He also spoke in Greece, Panama, Korea, and Japan, where he visited American military personnel and even joined them on field exercises. He received complimentary letters from students, service members, and private citizens throughout the world.

Author

He wrote three autobiographical books about his life and military experience. In 1986, he published The Three Wars of Roy Benavidez, which described his struggles growing up as a poor Mexican-American orphan, his military training and combat in Vietnam, and the efforts by others to get recognition for his actions in Vietnam. Benavidez later wrote The Last Medal of Honor (Texas: Swan Publishers, 1991) with Pete Billac and Medal of Honor: A Vietnam Warrior's Story in 1995.

== Death ==
Roy Benavidez died on November 29, 1998, at the age of 63 at Brooke Army Medical Center, having suffered respiratory failure and complications of diabetes. His body was escorted to St. Robert Bellarmine Catholic Church, where he had married, where his three children were married, and where he attended Mass every Sunday. His body was then returned to Fort Sam Houston's Main Chapel for a public viewing. Family friend Archbishop Patrick Flores of the Archdiocese of San Antonio presided over a Catholic funeral Mass at San Fernando Cathedral located in San Antonio.

Master Sergeant Roy Benavidez was buried with full military honors at Fort Sam Houston National Cemetery.

== Military decorations and awards ==
Benavidez's military awards include:

Personal decorations
Medal of Honor
Purple Heart with four Oak Leaf Clusters
Defense Meritorious Service Medal
Meritorious Service Medal
Army Commendation Medal
Army Achievement Medal
Army Good Conduct Medal with silver clasp and two loops
National Defense Service Medal with 1 Service star
Korean Service Medal with 1 Campaign star
Armed Forces Expeditionary Medal
Vietnam Service Medal with four campaign stars
NCO Professional Development Ribbon with award numeral 3
Army Service Ribbon
Army Overseas Service Ribbon
United Nations Korea Medal
Vietnam Campaign Medal with 1960– Device
Korean War Service Medal
Unit awards
Presidential Unit Citation
Meritorious Unit Commendation
Republic of Vietnam Gallantry Cross with Palm
Republic of Vietnam Civil Actions Medal with Palm
State awards
Texas Legislative Medal of Honor

Other accoutrements
Combat Infantryman Badge
Master Parachutist Badge
South Vietnamese Parachutist Badge
U.S Army Special Forces Distinctive unit insignia
Special Forces Tab
United States Army Special Forces CSIB
8 Service stripes
4 Overseas Service Bars

== Personal honors ==
Benavidez' personal honors include:

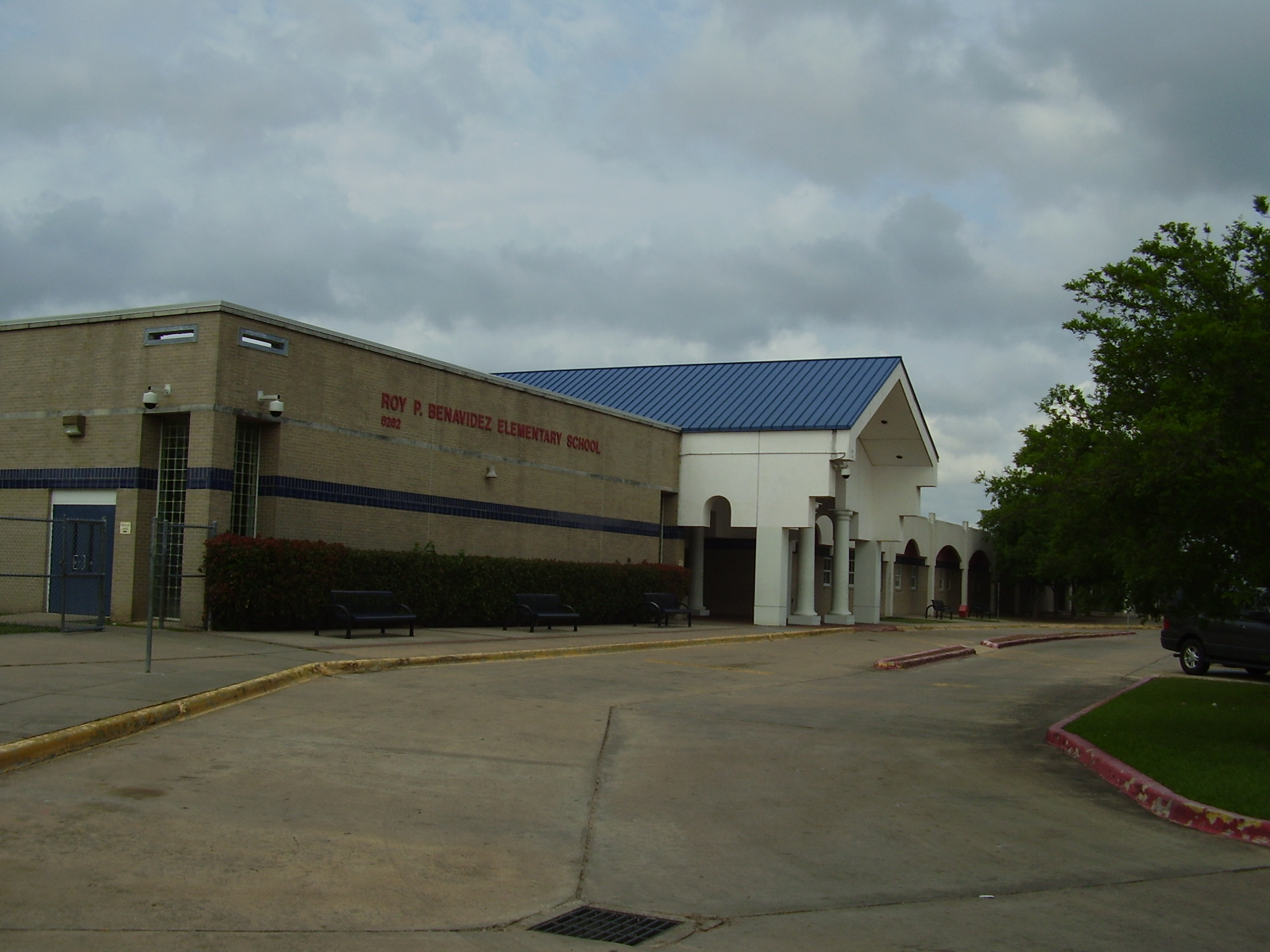
Roy P. Benavidez Elementary School in Gulfton, Houston, Texas

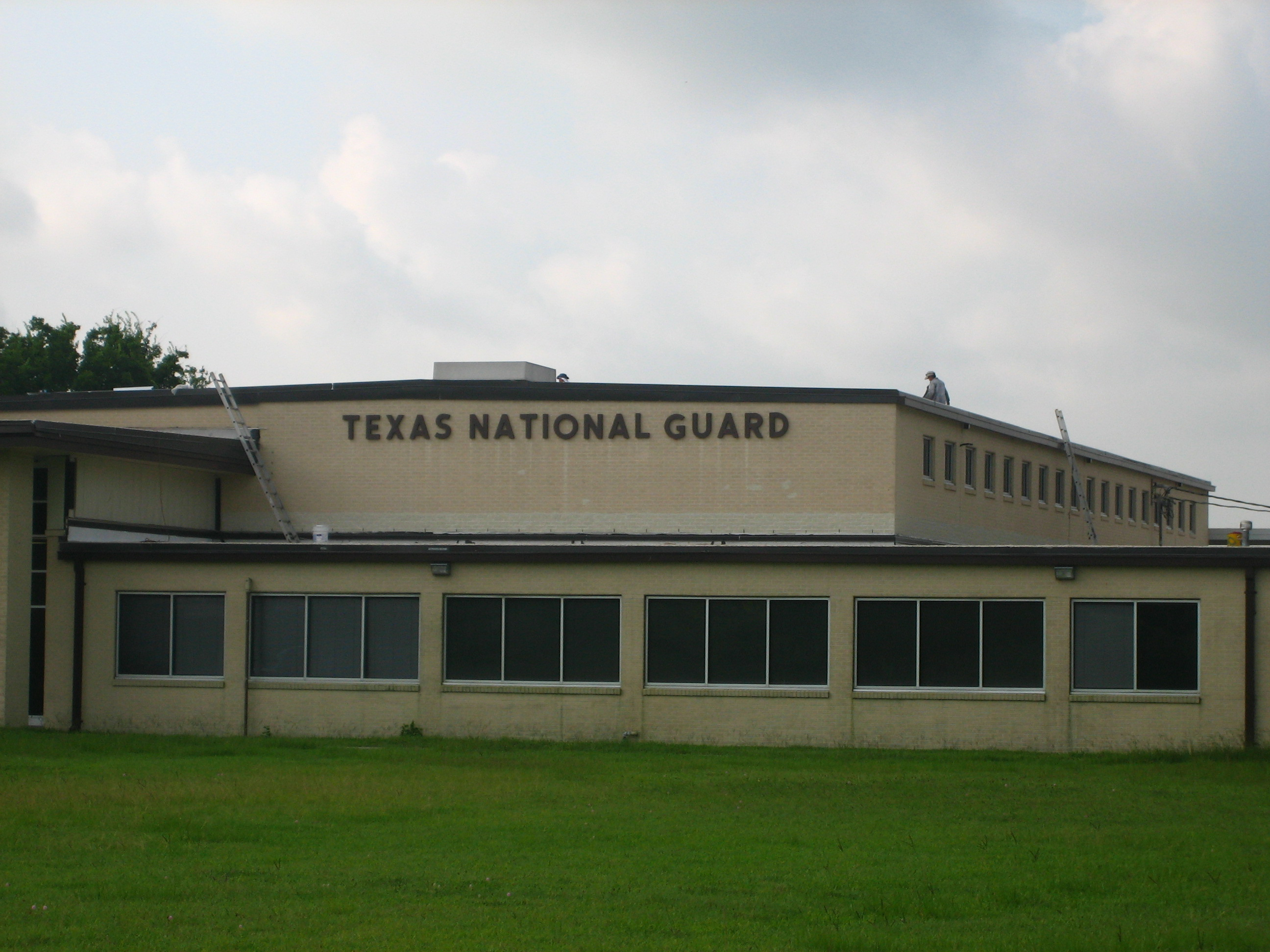
The Texas National Guard armory in El Campo

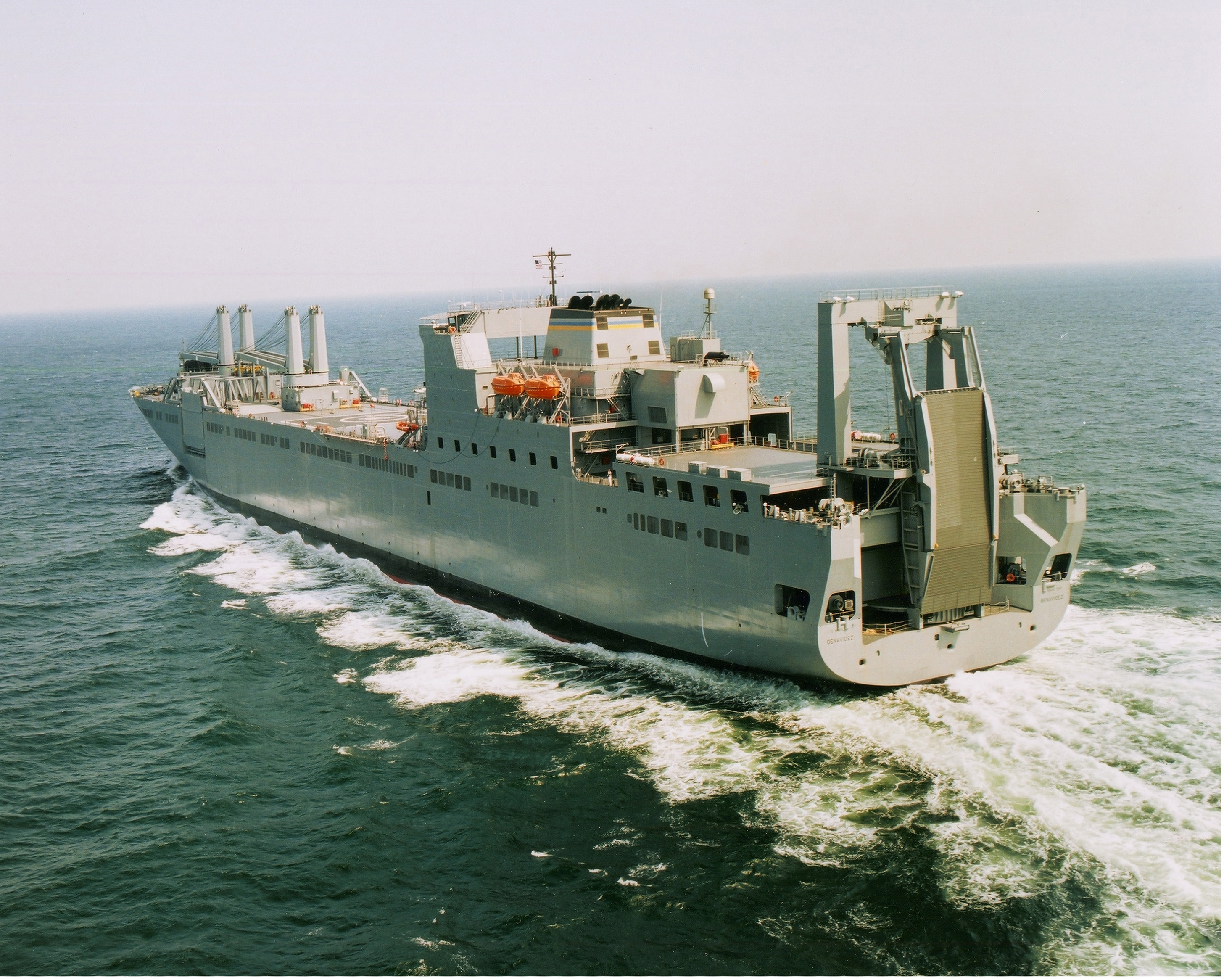
USNS Benavidez

- 1981 Texan of the Year
- Honorary Associate in Arts from the New Mexico Military Institute
- Special USPS Pictorial Cancellation Stamp
- Lifetime Achievement Award from St. Mary's University Alumni Law School in San Antonio, Texas
- Listed on the Medal of Honor Memorial in Indianapolis, Indiana
- Listed on The Medal of Honor Memorial at Riverside National Cemetery in Riverside, California
- Texas Legislative Medal of Honor
- G.I. Joe, Roy P. Benavidez Commemorative Edition (first Hispanic to be honored); released August 31, 2001
- Memorial Bench at Fort Sam Houston National Cemetery

Buildings and institutions with Benavidez's name include:

- Roy P. Benavidez-Robert M. Patterson "All Airborne" Chapter, 82nd Airborne Division Association, El Paso, Texas
- Roy P. Benavidez American Legion Post #400 in San Antonio, Texas
- Roy P. Benavidez Army Reserve Center, NAS Corpus Christi, Texas
- Roy P. Benavidez Artillery Training Area 67 at Fort Sill, Oklahoma
- Roy P. Benavidez City Park in Colorado Springs, Colorado
- Roy P. Benavidez Elementary School in Gulfton, Houston, Texas
- Roy P. Benavidez Elementary School in San Antonio, Texas
- Roy P. Benavidez Foundation, Inc.
- Roy P. Benavidez Military Range at Fort Knox, Kentucky
- Roy P. Benavidez National Guard Armory in El Campo, Texas
- Master Sergeant Roy P. Benavidez Noncommissioned Officer Academy of the Western Hemisphere Institute for Security Cooperation, Fort Benning, Georgia
- Roy P. Benavidez Scholarship Fund in El Campo
- Roy P. Benavidez Special Operations Logistic Complex at Fort Bragg, North Carolina
- Roy P. Benavidez Recreation Center in Eagle Pass, Texas

The conference room owned and operated by the Department of Military Instruction at the United States Military Academy is the Benavidez Room. Inside this room are signed pictures of MSG Benavidez, the citation from his Medal of Honor, and a G.I. Joe toy created in his likeness. The room is used primarily for planning Cadet Summer Military Training and hosting visitors.

The USNS Benavidez, a U.S. Navy Bob Hope-class roll on roll off vehicle cargo ship, is named in honor of MSG Benavidez.

Roy Benavidez's Medal of Honor is on display at the Ronald Reagan Library along with a video of him receiving the medal from President Reagan.

The portion of Texas State Highway 71 in Wharton County, Texas, where Benavidez grew up, located between the Colorado County line and FM 2765 is designated the Roy Benavidez Memorial Highway.

There were discussions to rename Fort Hood as Fort Benavidez as part of an ongoing movement to rename installations and institutions originally named for Confederate generals.

== See also ==
- List of Medal of Honor recipients for the Vietnam War
- List of Hispanic Medal of Honor recipients

== Notes ==
Footnotes

Citations
