= Nordheim High School =

Coordinates: 28.924952°N 97.613394°W

Location
- 500 N. Broadway; Nordheim, Texas 78141; United States

Information
- School type: Public high school
- School district: Nordheim Independent School District
- Principal: Lisa Karnei
- Teaching staff: 17.00 (FTE)
- Grades: PK-12
- Enrollment: 126 (2023-2024)
- Student to teacher ratio: 7.41
- Colors: Maroon & Gold
- Athletics conference: UIL Class A
- Mascot: Pirate/Lady Pirate
- Website: Nordheim School

Nordheim High School or Nordheim School is a public high school located in Nordheim, Texas (USA) and classified as a 1A school by the UIL. It is part of the Nordheim Independent School District located in southwestern DeWitt County. In 2015, the school was rated "Met Standard" by the Texas Education Agency.

== Athletics ==
The Nordheim Pirates compete in these sports: Cross Country, Volleyball, Basketball, Golf, Tennis, Track, Baseball, and Softball
