= Santiago J. Erevia =

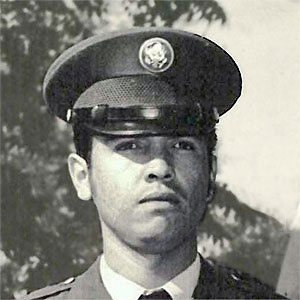
- Erevia during his time of service
- Born: Santiago Jesus Erevia; December 15, 1945; Nordheim, Texas, U.S.
- Died: March 22, 2016 (aged 70); San Antonio, Texas, U.S.
- Burial place: Fort Sam Houston National Cemetery, San Antonio, Texas
- Military career
- Allegiance: United States of America
- Branch: United States Army; Texas National Guard
- Service years: 1967–1970; 1972–1989
- Rank: Sergeant
- Units: Company C, 1st Battalion, 501st Infantry, 101st Airborne Division
- Conflicts: Vietnam War
- Awards: Medal of Honor; Bronze Star Medal; Purple Heart; Air Medal; Army Commendation Medal

Santiago Jesus Erevia (December 15, 1945 – March 22, 2016) was an American soldier who fought in the Vietnam War and a recipient of the Medal of Honor.

== Biography ==
Santiago Erevia, a Mexican-American, was born in Nordheim, Texas, in 1945, volunteering to join the United States Army in San Antonio when he was 22 years old.

Serving in the Vietnam War, his conduct resulted in his being presented with the Medal of Honor: while a Spc. 4, Erevia distinguished himself May 21, 1969, while serving as a radio-telephone operator during Operation Lamar Plain, a "search and destroy" mission near Tam Ky City, in the Republic of Vietnam.

In 1970, Erevia left active service with a two-year reserve obligation. In 1972, he joined the Texas National Guard and went on to serve 17 years. Erevia worked as a mail carrier for the United States Postal Service, retiring in 2002 after thirty-two years of service. Erevia died on March 22, 2016, in San Antonio, Texas, at the age of 70.

== Medal of Honor award ==
Erevia was one of two dozen veterans who received the Medal of Honor in 2014 after a Pentagon review, mandated by Congress in 2002, of past discrimination in the bestowal of the military's highest honor for valor. Erevia was awarded the Medal of Honor by President Barack Obama in a March 18, 2014 ceremony at the White House.

The award came through the Defense Authorization Act which called for a review of Jewish American and Hispanic American veterans from World War II, the Korean War and the Vietnam War to ensure that no prejudice was shown to those deserving the Medal of Honor.

Erevia receiving the Medal of Honor
during a White House ceremony on March 18, 2014
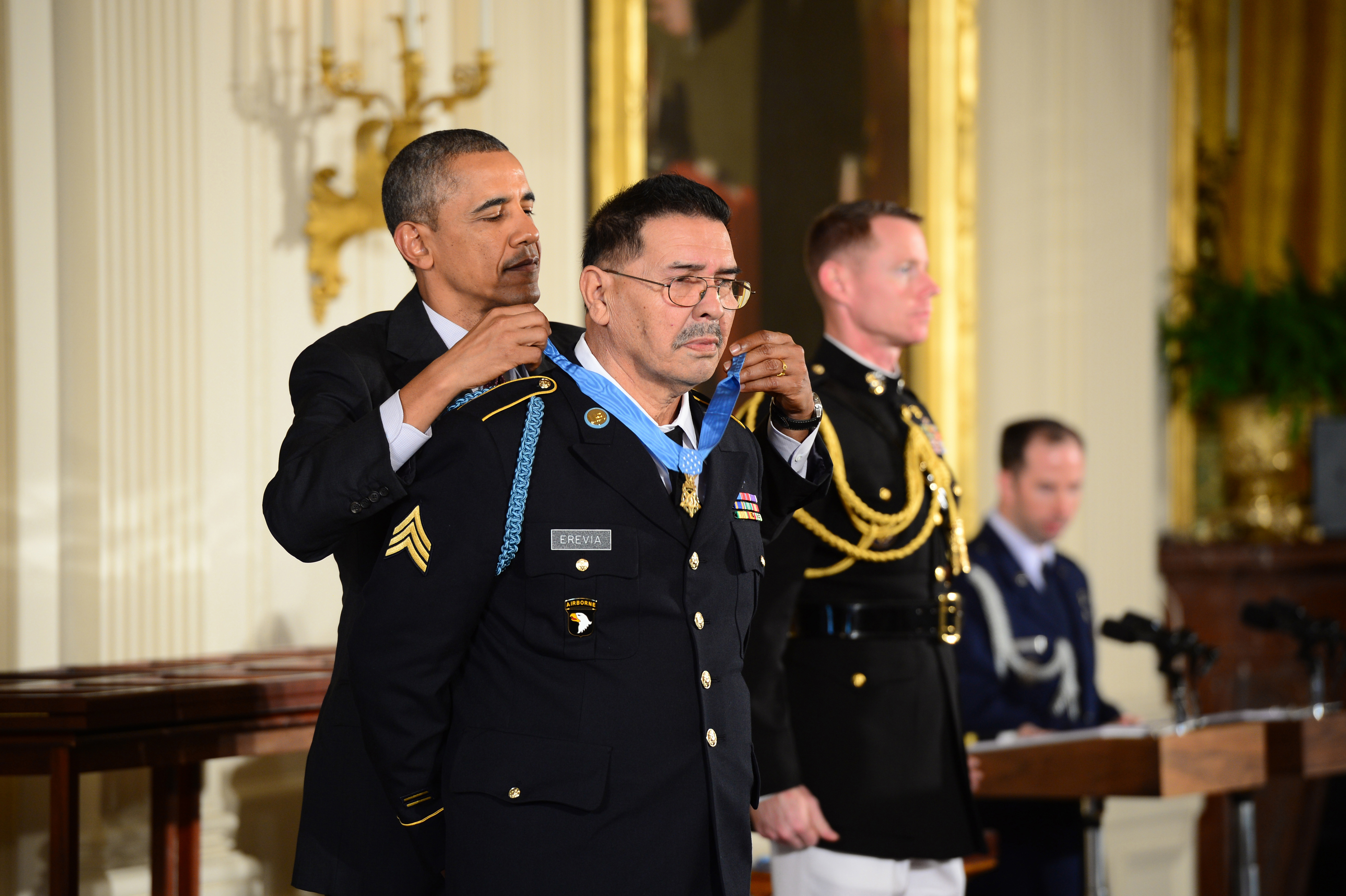

== Medal of Honor citation ==
Erevia's official Medal of Honor citation reads:

For conspicuous gallantry and intrepidity at the risk of his life above and beyond the call of duty:

Specialist Four Santiago J. Erevia distinguished himself by acts of gallantry and intrepidity above and beyond the call of duty while serving as a radio telephone operator in Company C, 1st Battalion (Airmobile), 501st Infantry, 101st Airborne Division (Airmobile) during search and clear mission near Tam Ky, Republic of Vietnam on May 21, 1969. After breaching an insurgent perimeter, Specialist Four Erevia was designated by his platoon leader to render first aid to several casualties, and the rest of the platoon moved forward. As he was doing so, he came under intense hostile fire from four bunkers to his left front. Although he could have taken cover with the rest of the element, he chose a retaliatory course of action. With heavy enemy fire directed at him, he moved in full view of the hostile gunners as he proceeded to crawl from one wounded man to another, gathering ammunition. Armed with two M-16 rifles and several hand grenades, he charged toward the enemy positions behind the suppressive fire of the two rifles. Under very intense fire, he continued to advance on the insurgents until he was near the first bunker. Disregarding the enemy fire, he pulled the pin from a hand grenade and advanced on the bunker, leveling suppressive fire until he could drop the grenade into the bunker, mortally wounding the insurgent and destroying the fortification. Without hesitation, he employed identical tactics as he proceeded to eliminate the next two enemy positions. With the destruction of the third bunker, Specialist Four Erevia had exhausted his supply of hand grenades. Still under intense fire from the fourth position, he courageously charged forward behind the fire emitted by his M-16 rifles. Arriving at the very edge of the bunker, he silenced the occupant within the fortification at point blank range. Through his heroic actions the lives of the wounded were saved and the members of the Company Command Post were relieved from a very precarious situation. His exemplary performance in the face of overwhelming danger was an inspiration to his entire company and contributed immeasurably to the success of the mission. Specialist Four Erevia's conspicuous gallantry, extraordinary heroism, and intrepidity at the risk of his own life, above and beyond the call of duty, were in keeping with the highest traditions of military service and reflect great credit upon himself, his unit, and the United States Army.

Citation represents Soldier's rank at time of action.

== Other awards and citations ==
In addition to receiving the Medal of Honor, Erevia received the Bronze Star Medal, Purple Heart, Air Medal, Army Commendation Medal, National Defense Service Medal, Vietnam Service Medal with five Bronze Service Stars, Combat Infantryman Badge, Sharpshooter Marksmanship Badge with Auto Rifle Bar, Marksman Marksmanship Badge with Rifle Bar, Republic of Vietnam Campaign Medal with "60" Device, Republic of Vietnam Gallantry Cross with Gold Star Device and Republic of Vietnam Civil Actions Honor Medal, First Class.

== See also ==
- List of Medal of Honor recipients for the Vietnam War
