= Concrete, DeWitt County, Texas =

Unincorporated community

Coordinates: 29°14′18″N 97°17′35″W

Concrete is a ghost town in DeWitt County, in the U.S. state of Texas.

== History ==
Concrete was founded in 1846, making it one of the county's oldest communities. The settlement was named for the early adobe concrete used in local buildings and homes. A post office was established at Concrete in 1853, and remained in operation until 1907. With the construction of the railroad in 1873, business activity shifted to nearby towns, and the Concrete's population dwindled
