= Gaza Development Plan =

Plan of the Naftali Bennett administration

The Gaza Development Plan is a proposed plan put forward by the Israeli Prime Minister Naftali Bennett and Israeli Foreign Minister Yair Lapid in September 2021 with the intent to mediate an end to the Gaza–Israel conflict. The plan promises to repair the Gazan standard of living and help construct new Gazan infrastructure.

Bennett has stated that although the project aims to improve Palestinian living conditions, he also stressed that his government would not negotiate with Hamas, which Israel recognizes as a terrorist organization. The proposed plan has been presented to the European Union, Russia, the United States, and Egypt.

== Phase 1 ==
The first phase aims to repair Gazan infrastructure, and would see the construction of a desalination plant and natural gas pipelines. It would also see the repairing of Gaza’s power lines.

== Phase 2 ==
Phase two would see the construction of a sea port on top of an artificial island under Israeli security control for the Gaza Strip and a Gaza-West Bank Road link.

== See also ==
- Blockade of the Gaza Strip
- Gaza floating pier
- Israeli–Palestinian peace process
