= Mobile-Low, Slow, Small Unmanned Aircraft Integrated Defeat System =

Drone defence system

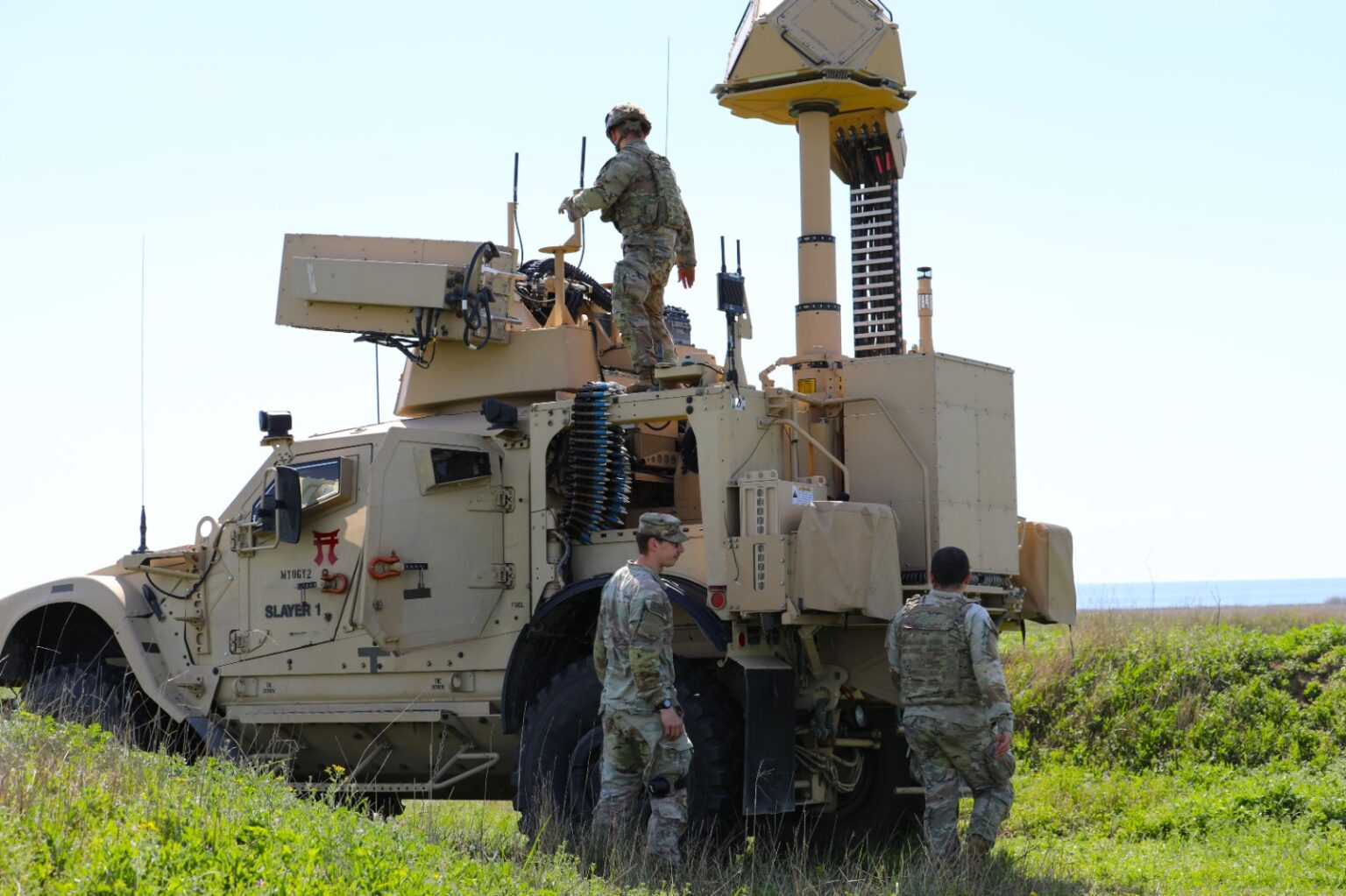
M-LIDS live fire exercise in Capu Midia, Romania, 10 April 2024

Mobile-Low, Slow, Small Unmanned Aircraft Integrated Defeat System (M-LIDS) is a mobile counter-unmanned aerial system (C-UAS) developed for the United States Army. It is designed to detect, track, and neutralize small unmanned aerial systems, commonly known as drones.

== Overview ==
M-LIDS is engineered to counter small, low-flying, and slow-moving drones that are often used for surveillance, reconnaissance, and attacks; the system comprises advanced detection systems, including sophisticated radar and electronic warfare capabilities. For neutralization, M-LIDS employs a cannon or kinetic interceptors such as the Coyote missile, as well as electronic warfare measures to disable or destroy the drone threats

== Connection to C-RAM ==
M-LIDS is often deployed with the Counter-Rocket, Artillery, and Mortar (C-RAM) system. While C-RAM intercepts rockets, artillery, and mortar rounds, M-LIDS focuses on aerial threats from drones, providing comprehensive defense.

== Operational history ==
=== Gaza Floating Pier ===
- Date of deployment: 21 May 2024
- Details: Deployed to protect humanitarian aid operations in the Gaza Strip. Installed alongside C-RAM for layered defense

=== Romania ===
- Date of deployment: April 2024
- Details: Deployed as part of the U.S. 101st Airborne Division to enhance air defenses near Ukraine. Conducted live fire exercises at the Capu Midia Training Range
