= Gaza floating pier =

Gaza dock provided by US military

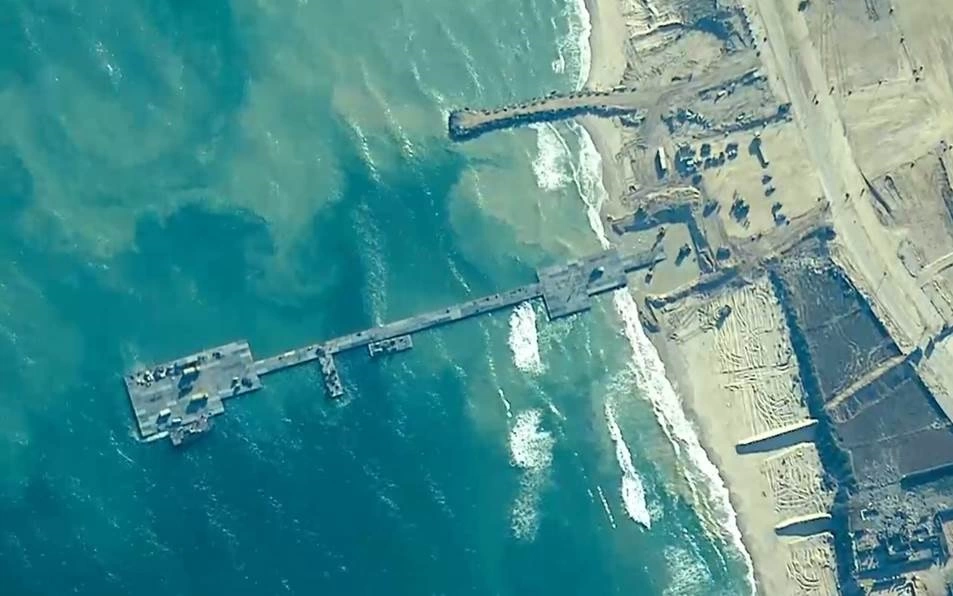
- Causeway connected to Gaza shore, shortly after completion on May 16
- Type: Barge landing
- Carries: Food aid from Cyprus
- Location: Mediterranean Sea off Gaza Strip
- Coordinates: 31.497°N 34.408°E

Characteristics
- Construction: US Army, US Navy

History
- Construction start: April 6, 2024
- Completion date: May 16, 2024
- Opening date: May 17, 2024
- Closure date: July 17, 2024

The Gaza floating pier was a temporary U.S. military-built floating dock facility, first proposed immediately before U.S. President Joe Biden's 2024 State of the Union Address on March 7, 2024. It operated between May and July 2024.

Constructed by U.S. military forces based on ships offshore of the Gaza Strip and linked to the shore by a causeway, the pier was designed to enable the delivery of maritime cargo for humanitarian assistance to Gaza. The unloading point joined the Israeli-controlled Netzarim Corridor, with the World Food Programme overseeing the aid's receipt and distribution.

U.S. President Joe Biden stated that Israel "must also do its part." He noted, "Humanitarian assistance cannot be a secondary consideration or a bargaining chip. Protecting and saving innocent lives has to be a priority." Israel planned to inspect the humanitarian aid in Cyprus before it was shipped to the pier and again at Israeli checkpoints in Gaza once it was moved off the pier. The pier could deliver 150 trucks of aid per day. After its collapse, it was described by Stephen Walt as an expensive PR stunt to sidestep pressuring Israel to open its border crossings. The United States denied allegations that Israeli forces had used the Gaza floating pier during the Nuseirat rescue and massacre.

At its closure announcement on July 17, the pier had been operational for 20 days, delivering 8,800 tonnes (19,400,000 lb) of aid. The pier had been dismantled three times because of high sea states.

== Background ==
A blockade has been imposed on the movement of goods and people in and out of the Gaza Strip since Hamas came to power in 2007, led by Israel and supported by Egypt. The blockade's current stated aim is to prevent the smuggling of weapons into Gaza; previously stated motivations have included exerting economic pressure on Hamas.

Attempts to bring in humanitarian aid by water into Gaza have been attempted multiple times and have ended with intervention by the Israeli military. In May 2010, the Israel Defense Forces (IDF) participated in a military operation dubbed the Gaza flotilla raid against six civilian ships in international waters, resulting in contested events; nine passengers of the flotilla killed and thirty passengers and 10 IDF troops wounded. In July 2011, a second flotilla was planned by 22 NGOs to attempt to break the maritime blockade but did not take place. In the summer of 2015, a third flotilla was planned to break the blockade and set out from Sweden with multiple stops before being intercepted by the Israeli military in international waters and participants detained.

The Gaza Strip is experiencing a humanitarian crisis as a result of the Gaza war, which began after the Hamas attack on Israel on October 7, 2023. The crisis includes both a famine and the destruction of Gaza's healthcare system. At the start of the war, Israel tightened its blockade of the Gaza Strip on October 9, 2023, with Israel's Defense Minister Yoav Gallant announced a "total blockade", blocking the entry of food, water, medicine, fuel, and electricity. This has resulted in significant shortages of fuel, food, medication, water, and essential medical supplies. After receiving pressure from U.S. President Biden, Gallant changed his position of a complete blockade and a deal was made on 19 October for Israel and Egypt to allow aid into Gaza.

In January 2024, Israeli authorities blocked 56% of humanitarian aid to northern Gaza. On February 9, 2024, UNRWA's director Philippe Lazzarini reported that Israel had blocked food for 1.1 million Palestinians in Gaza.

== Outline plan ==
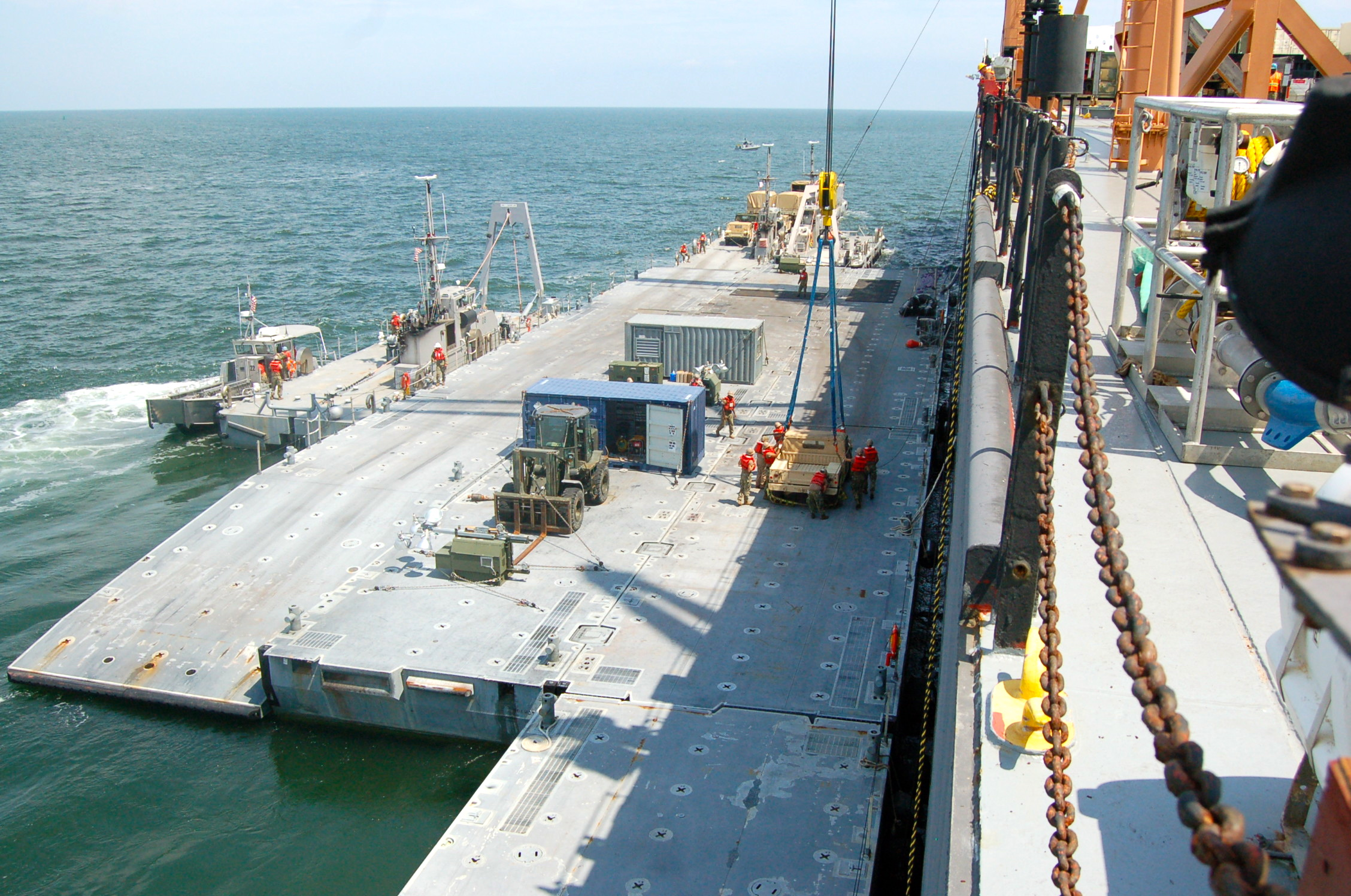
A JLOTS offshore modular unloading platform in 2012

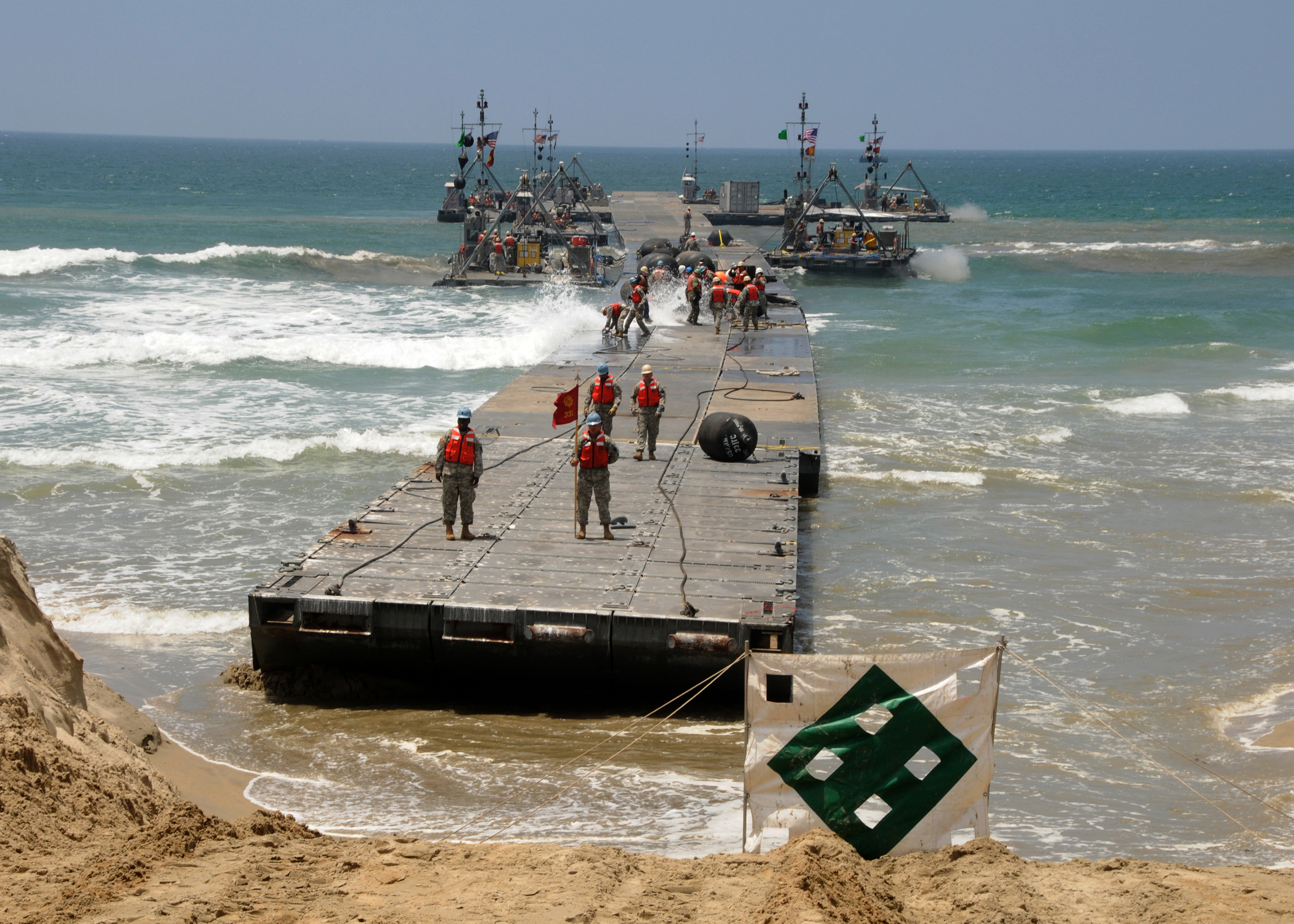
Army and Navy personnel constructing a JLOTS floating pier in 2008

During October and November 2023, Cypriot President Nikos Christodoulides developed the maritime aid corridor idea, named the Amalthea Initiative, with European Union leaders at a humanitarian conference in Paris and elsewhere. On November 5, 2023, U.S. Secretary of State Antony Blinken visited Cyprus to discuss the maritime aid corridor.

On November 20, 2023, Christodoulides said Cyprus was ready to ship large quantities of humanitarian aid to Gaza when a pause in fighting was declared. He noted that shallow-draft vessels could be used in the short term to ferry aid, and in the medium term, a floating dock off Gaza could be used. He had regularly contacted the Israeli Prime Minister about the proposal, but getting authorization required careful negotiations. An Israeli Foreign Ministry spokesperson said Israel was "definitely in favor of the project."

The Jerusalem Post reported that a senior Israeli diplomatic source said the plan was based on a proposal for a maritime route to Gaza via Cyprus for humanitarian assistance initiated by Israeli Prime Minister Benjamin Netanyahu in collaboration with President Biden on October 22, 2023. The Jerusalem Post reported that on October 31, Netanyahu outlined this proposal to Cypriot President Christodoulides. On January 19, 2024, Netanyahu proposed to Biden that a team should be set up to explore the proposal, including inspecting all goods transported. On December 20, Israeli Foreign Minister Eli Cohen said, "The creation of a maritime corridor to Gaza will help Israel's economic disengagement from the Strip", following a meeting with Cypriot Foreign Minister Constantinos Kombos to discuss the maritime aid corridor. Israeli Foreign Minister Avigdor Lieberman had proposed a similar plan to Cyprus in 2010 when it was called the Lieberman Proposal, and again in 2018 when he was Defense Minister. In 2021, Israeli Foreign Minister Yair Lapid proposed the Gaza Development Plan which included a sea port on an artificial island under Israeli security control off Gaza.

The pier was designed to allow delivery of thousands of tons of food aid at a time, equivalent to "hundreds of truckloads", via barges embarked in Cyprus and screened for contraband there by Cyprus Police.

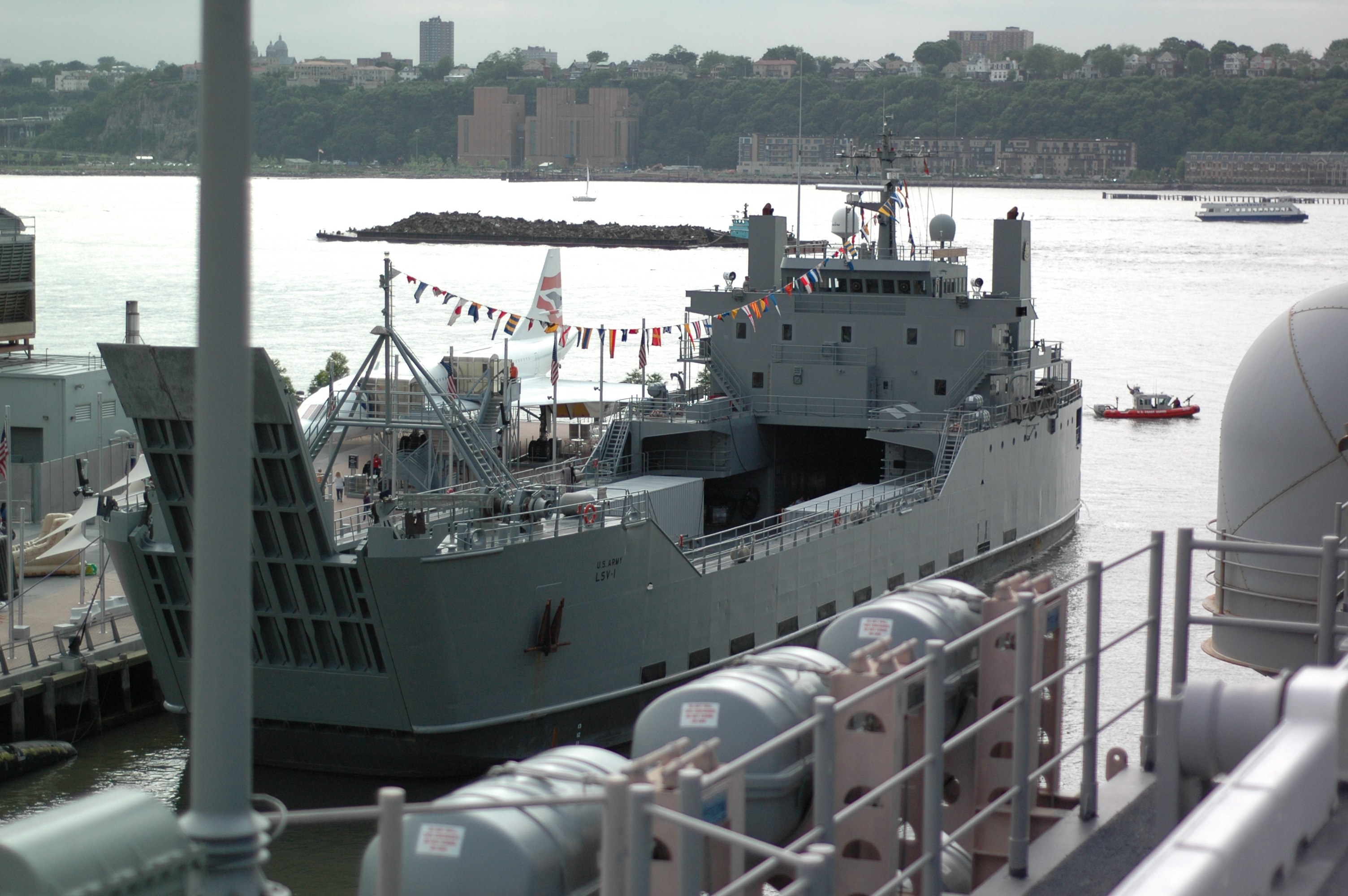
General Frank S. Besson supported construction of the Gaza pier.

Over 1,000 U.S. military personnel were involved in the construction of the pier and 1,800 foot (550 m) long Joint Logistics Over-The-Shore (JLOTS) type modular causeway over 60 days. The part of the JLOTS system included in this project is a large floating modular unloading platform secured by sea anchors stationed about three miles offshore, allowing supplies to be then transferred by lighters to a modular causeway off the shore. The project, known internally as the Blue Beach Plan, was partially developed by an advisory group called Fogbow, co-founded by Michael Mulroy, a former deputy assistant secretary of defense, and Sam Mundy, a retired Marine Lt. Gen. The plan includes potentially dredging a corridor on a private beachfront to aid unloading. The goal is to allow barges to approach the shore for aid distribution onto trucks. The military pier, once operational, could provide another way for aid delivery. The Joint Logistics Over-The-Shore (JLOTS) was not required under the original Blue Beach Plan.

=== Fogbow plan ===
The Fogbow plan was a strategy created by the American advisory group Fogbow, founded by Michael Mulroy and Sam Mundy and managed by former US Military, Intelligence, and United Nations personnel, to establish a maritime corridor. According to the initial Fogbow plan, a significant portion of aid would be transported using Masri trucks to the Gaza Industrial Zone, a specified area within the Gaza sector. Additionally, Fogbow aimed to set up a new beach landing site to deliver humanitarian aid. The initiative sought to improve aid distribution by increasing the number of drop zones along the coast, making it easier to transport aid to remote areas that are difficult to reach by typical overland routes. The IDF agreed to provide security assistance to Fogbow. To support the implementation of this plan, funding would be directed through a recently established foundation called the "Maritime Humanitarian Aid Foundation."

As of June 2024, the pier has handled thousands of tons of food aid, with Fogbow delivering over a thousand pallets of food.

== Temporary interim jetty ==
On March 12, prior to construction of the U.S. pier, a barge "testing" the delivery route, operated by Spanish charity Proactiva Open Arms and loaded with 200 tons of food from World Central Kitchen, left the port of Larnaca in Cyprus for Gaza. A jetty for unloading the barge was built at a location that was initially "not disclosed for security reasons", but later discerned to be south of Gaza City (31.497°N 34.408°E) by journalists using commercial satellite imagery or talking to local construction workers. The Cyprus foreign minister, Constantinos Kombos, said on March 13 that the US pier and the food route out of Larnaca would become a single operation. The first barge arrived and began to be unloaded at the World Central Kitchen jetty on March 15.

== Construction and route history ==
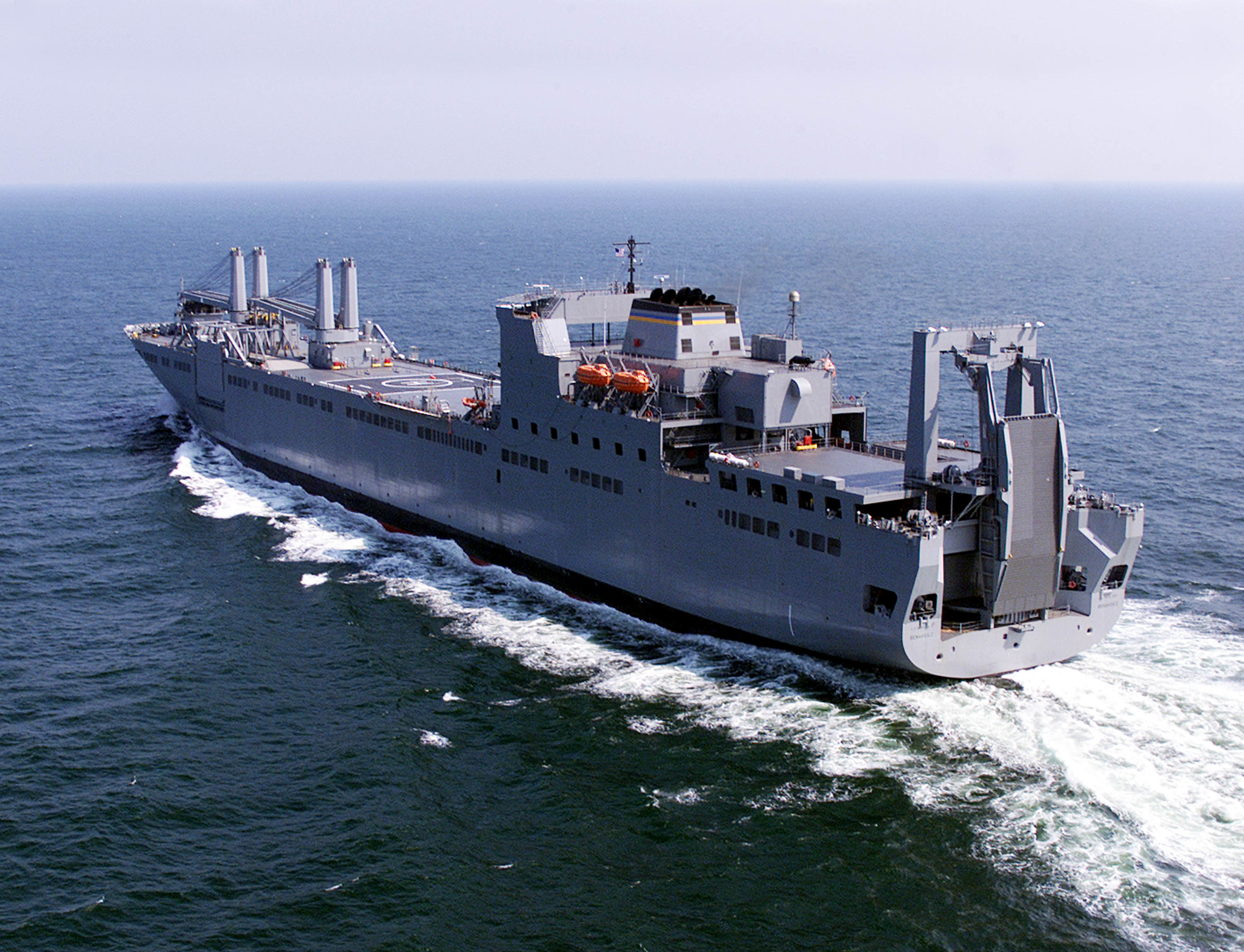
MV Roy P. Benavidez

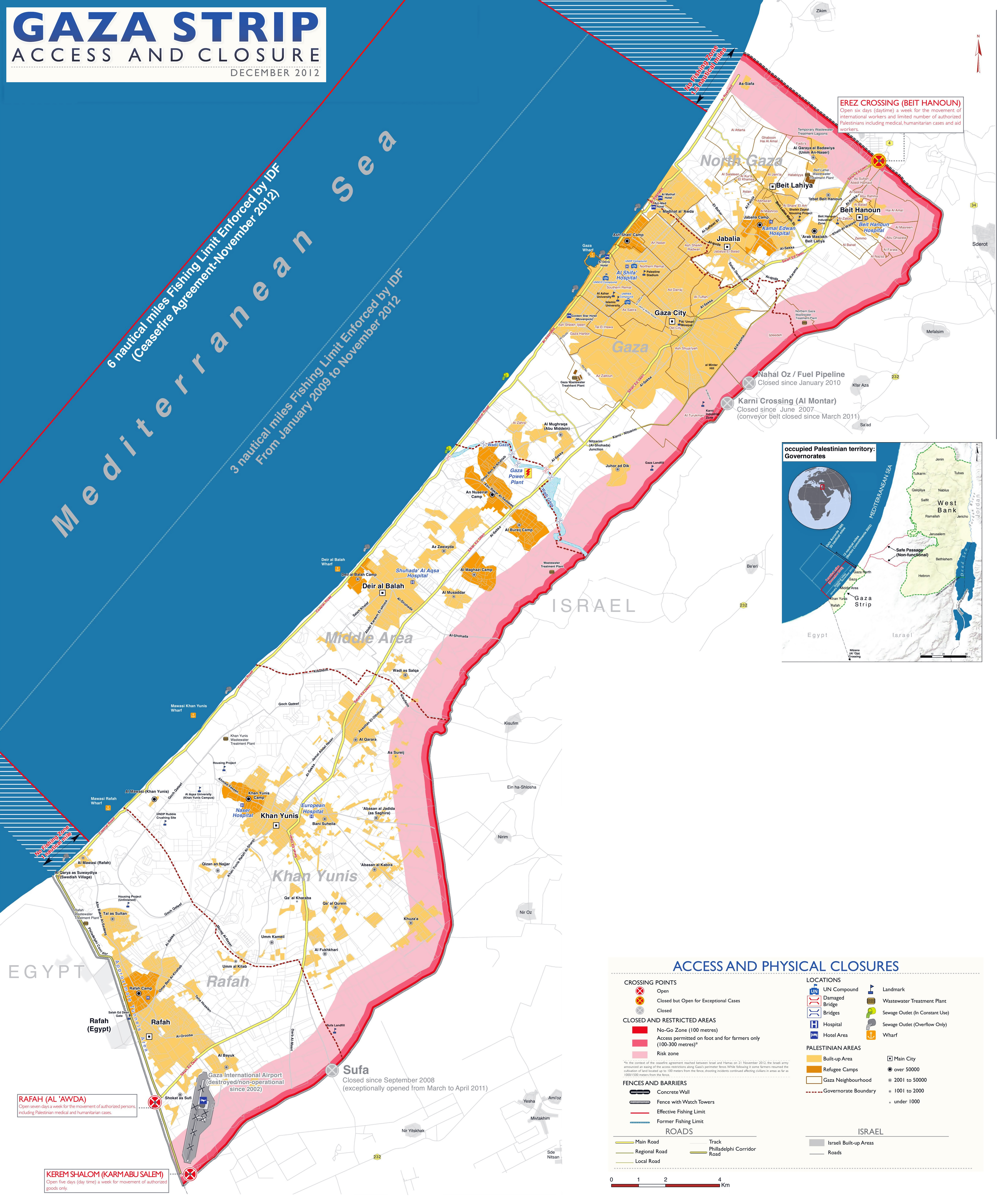
Construction began in the Mediterranean Sea 8 km from Gaza Strip, inside the exclusion zone shown here

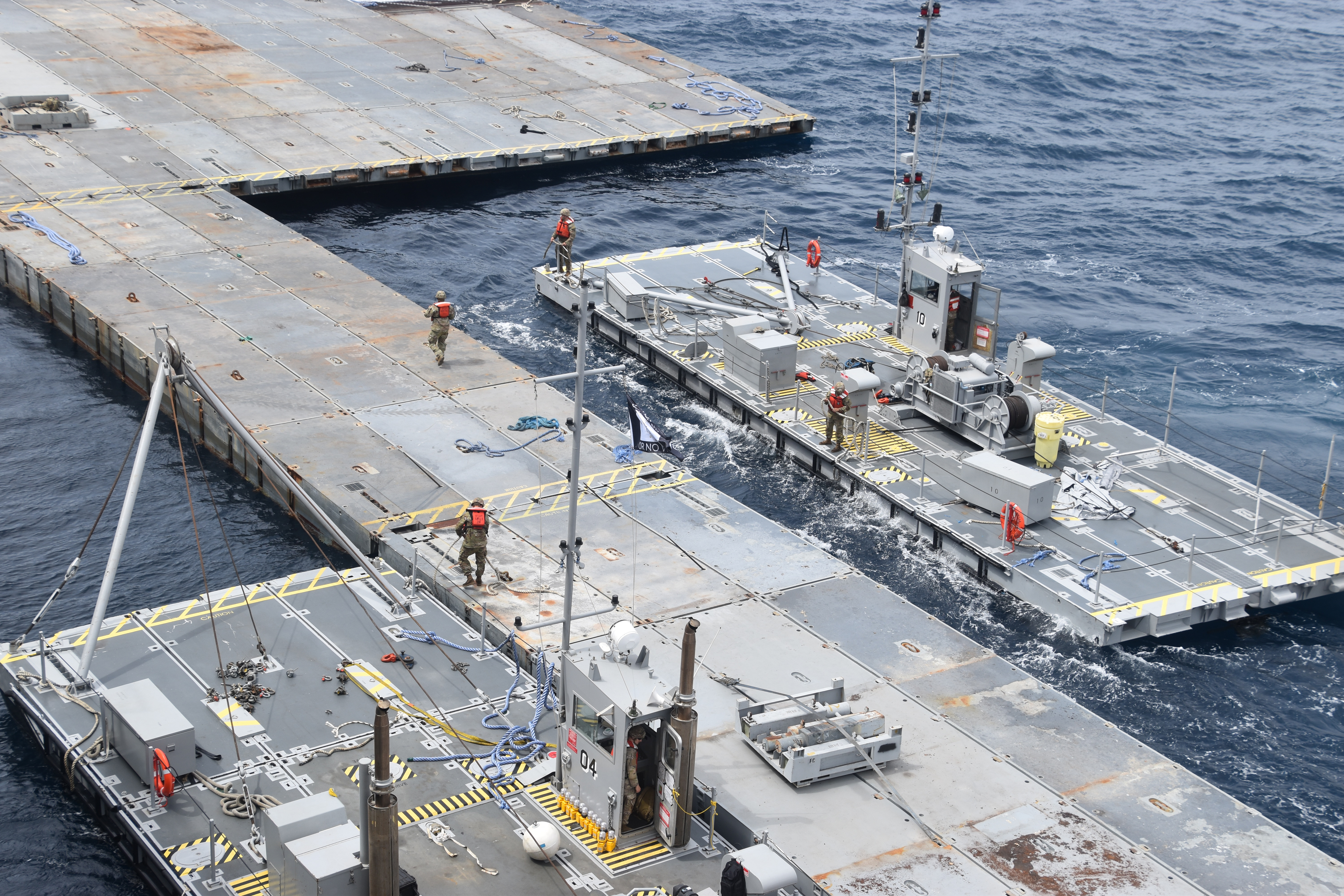
Construction of the floating pier, April 26, 2024

On March 9, 2024, the U.S. Army support ship General Frank S. Besson was sent from Norfolk to begin pier construction. Four more ships with 500 Army troops left on March 12. The ships included landing craft USAV Wilson Wharf, USAV Matamoros and USAV Monterrey; and Besson-class support ship USAV SP4 James A. Loux. In addition to Army, Naval Beach Group 1 from San Diego, and MV Roy P. Benavidez (T-AKR-306) from an East Coast maritime reserve force were assigned to assist in construction. Roy P. Benavidez departed from Virginia on March 21.

The Senate Intelligence and Foreign Relations Committee chairpersons Mark Warner and Ben Cardin (both Democrats) requested briefings from the Biden administration on the force protection plan for the U.S. units participating in the construction. On March 28, the Chairman of the Joint Chiefs told the press that Israel would be providing security during the installation of the pier.

By April 5, Besson and Benavidez had reached the Mediterranean. By April 17, Besson, Benavidez and three other Army vessels had reached Crete. During April the IDF prepared the 67 acres (27 ha) concrete walled landing site which included a storage zone for aid awaiting movement by trucking contractors into Gaza. The Royal Navy participated in the effort; RFA Cardigan Bay was used by American soldiers and sailors as a dormitory.

On April 26, construction of the pier by US forces began, and satellite photos published a few days later showed Benavidez building the dock 8 kilometers (4.3 nautical miles) from the Gaza shore.

On May 1, a Pentagon spokesperson said that the floating pier was complete, and the causeway was under construction, with the total project more than half completed. On May 7, it was reported that the causeway had been assembled offshore and was ready to be moved and connected to the shore.

A Centurion C-RAM (Counter-Rocket, Artillery, and Mortar) and the M-LIDS anti-drone systems were installed in May by the shore-attached section of the pier for force protection.

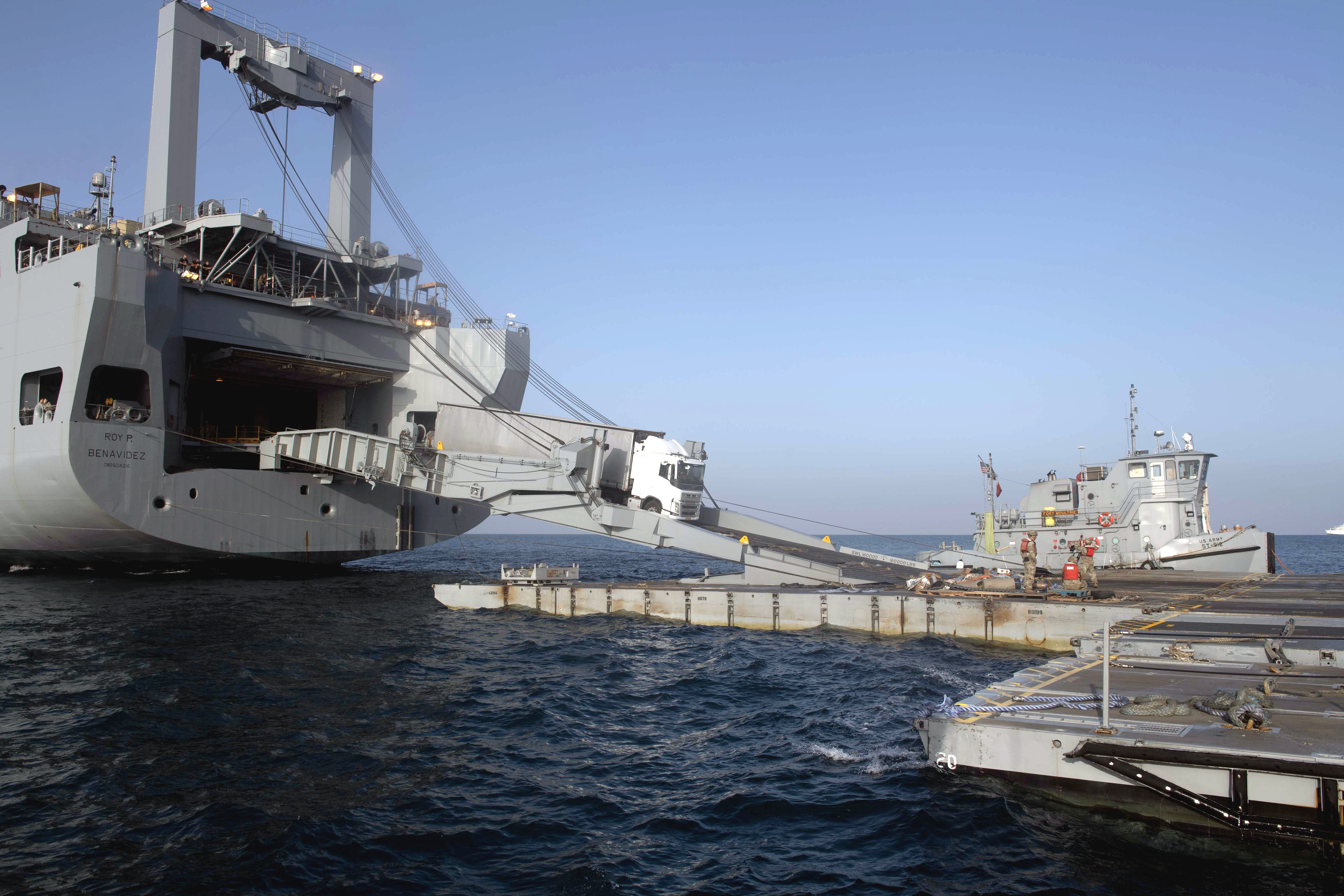
Truck with humanitarian aid drives down ship ramp to roll-on/roll-off discharge facility (RRDF) about 3 nautical miles offshore on first day of operation.

On May 16, the U.S. military announced that the causeway had been anchored and connected to the Gaza shoreline. Trucks began delivering aid off of the pier on May 17. On May 21, a Pentagon spokesperson said that 569 tonnes of aid had crossed the temporary pier but had so far not been distributed, and that moving forward on "safety and security" for humanitarian aid organization workers was critical.

The U.S. military cost estimate to build the pier and operate it for 90 days was $320 million, roughly double the initial estimate. Two U.S. Army service members who were injured in May while working on the project later returned to duty, but a third, Sgt. Quandarius Stanley, died on October 31.

=== Damage and repair ===
On May 25, 2024, the U.S. military announced that four boats that were part of the pier's support system broke off from the structure following choppy waters. The four boats became beached, with the military stating that the structure would remain operational. It also added that efforts were underway to retrieve the four vessels.

On May 28, 2024, the U.S. military suspended aid delivery to Gaza after the floating pier was damaged by bad weather. The Pentagon confirmed that a portion of the causeway was damaged and broken off, and must be repaired before being returned to use. Spokeswoman Sabrina Singh stated that the pier will be removed from the sea with help from the Israeli Navy and undergo over a week of repairs in Ashdod before returning. Fogbow is directly involved with the JLOTS in moving the pier to and from the safe harbor in Ashdod.

At the beginning of June, the Pentagon estimated that up to the suspension over 1,000 tonnes of aid had been delivered to shore, 900 tonnes of which had reached UN warehouses.

The repaired pier was reinstalled by June 7. Around June 18, 2024, after being operative for ten days, US officials indicated that the pier could be dismantled by early July. On 22 June, parts of the pier washed up on Frishman Beach in Tel Aviv. The US said on 28 June that they were for the third time moving the pier due to weather conditions and said that it may not be restored.

The pier constructed by the U.S. military to deliver humanitarian aid to Gaza was scheduled for reinstallation on July 10, 2024, for temporary use. As of July 11, the pier was authorized for operation through the end of the month of July, with possible extension until weather makes it untenable. On July 11, US officials confirmed that the pier would soon cease operations.

=== Shutdown ===
Vice Admiral Brad Cooper announced on July 17 that "[t]he maritime surge mission involving the pier is complete". Cooper said the pier had been operational for 20 days, delivering 19.4 million pounds (8,800 metric tons) of aid. The remaining aid in Cyprus will be delivered to the port of Ashdod in Israel with the assistance of the US military, then delivered to Gaza by trucks via the Erez Crossing.

== Alleged role in Nuseirat attack ==
On June 8, 2024, Israel initiated a military action that rescued 4 hostages and killed 274 Palestinians according to the Gaza Health Ministry. While the United States acknowledged assisting Israel in the operation, it denied that the floating pier was used. A video emerged on social media showing an Israeli Black Hawk helicopter close to the pier picking up IDF soldiers and hostages. The video also shows military equipment, including a US counter-drone system, on the pier.

The Popular Resistance Committees in Gaza released a statement in which it "confirms the participation of American enemy forces stationed on the floating dock" to conduct an attack on the Nuseira refugee camp. Euro-Med Human Rights Monitor said IDF didn't just evacuate using the pier and that it was likely that the IDF entered into Gaza using the pier as well. United States officials told CBS News reporters that the video appearing to show the helicopter taking off from the beach near the pier, showed the helicopter landing south of the facility and not within the cordoned off area adjacent to pier.

Shortly after the rescue operation, it was announced that the United Nations World Food Program would pause all of its work with the pier, until a security review and review of how the IDF may have utilized the pier was completed. During the review, undistributed humanitarian aid remained on the beach, as the UN worked to transfer it to warehouses and local aid teams within Gaza.

== Reactions ==
On May 17, 2024, the spokesperson for UNOCHA stated that getting aid into Gaza "cannot and should not depend on a floating dock far from where needs are most acute". On May 21, the UN stated aid had not entered Gaza from the pier in two days, and that it was at risk of failure unless Israel provided safe operating conditions for humanitarian organizations. The White House National Security communications adviser stated, "This temporary pier is not enough... Clearly not enough is being done to open up the crossings. That's just unacceptable". In June 2024, the media office for Hamas government in the Gaza Strip criticized the pier, stating only 120 trucks had come through it and that it was "useless".

Stephen Walt criticized the whole operation for its cost – after the damage expected to run into hundreds of millions – arguing that the project arose from the Biden administration's reluctance to pressure Israel into opening its borders to allow relief aid in sufficient quantities to overcome the humanitarian crisis in Gaza and sustain the population. Military experts noted that JLOTS (Joint Logistics Over-the-Shore) type piers were not designed to operate in rough seas and were last used in Haiti in 2010. Since then, relatively little investment has been directed to the technology; the watercraft are old, and funds for repairs have been scarce, with available craft rusting. Firms that had earlier supplied parts had now gone out of business. One military source said that the Army has long underestimated the difficulty of constructing and maintaining a floating pier. The administration itself admits that the best way to supply Gaza is through land routes.

The Financial Times estimated less than 600 trucks of aid were delivered via the pier, about two days of aid to Gaza before the war, calling the pier a "colossal failure".

At a press conference on July 11, US President Biden said he was disappointed with the failures in providing aid through the Gaza floating pier.

== See also ==
- Port of Gaza
- Gaza Seaport plans
