= Clinton, DeWitt County, Texas =

Ghost town in Texas, United States

Coordinates: 33°06′12″N 96°14′09″W

Clinton is a ghost town in DeWitt County, in the U.S. state of Texas.

== History ==
Clinton was once the county seat of DeWitt County. A post office called Clinton was established in 1849, and remained in operation until it was discontinued in 1886.
