= MV Roy P. Benavidez =

Cargo ship of the United States Navy

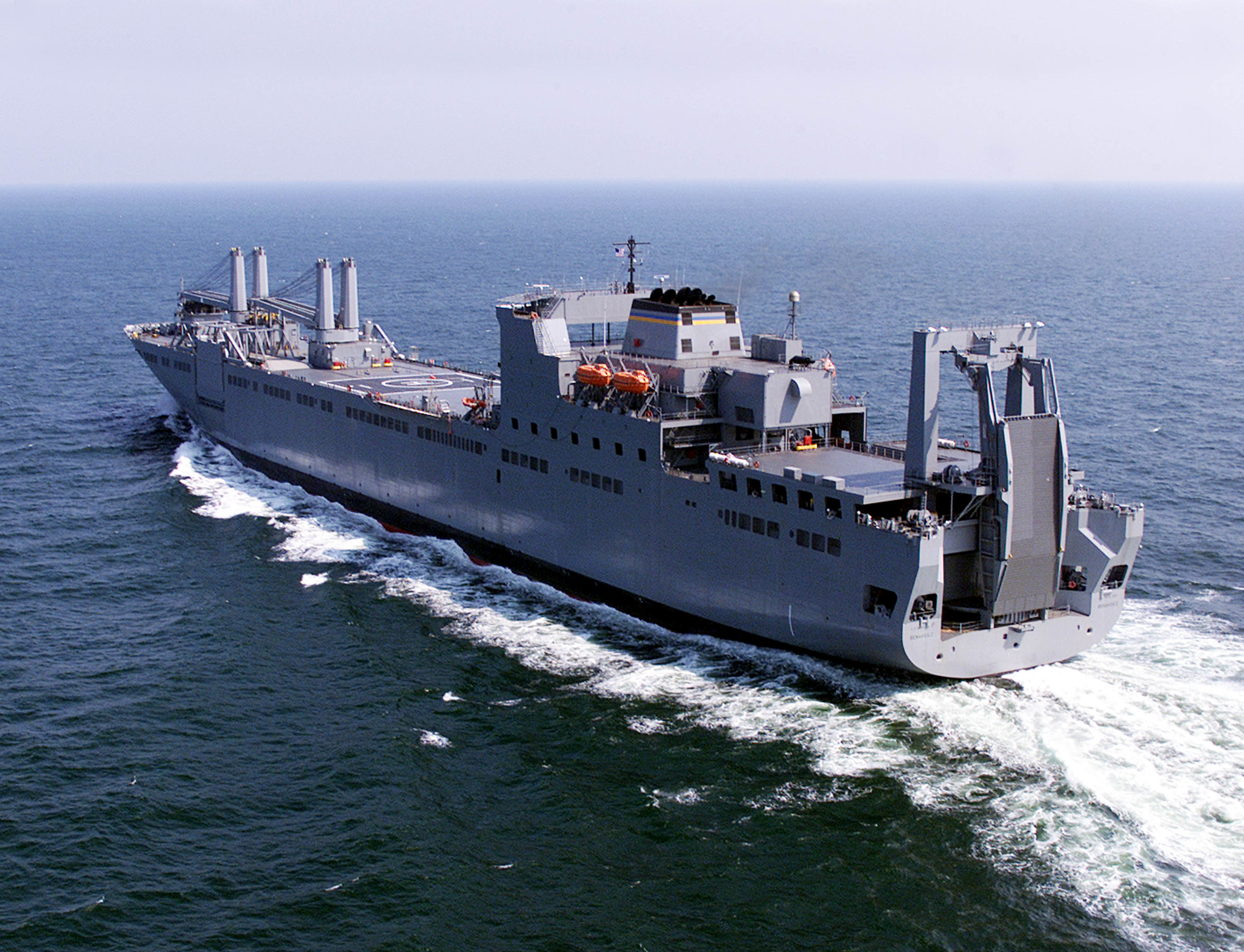

History

United States
- Name: USNS Benavidez
- Operator: Military Sealift Command
- Builder: Northrop Grumman Ship Systems, New Orleans
- Laid down: 15 December 1999
- Launched: 11 August 2001
- Completed: 10 September 2003
- In service: 10 September 2003
- Out of service: 21 September 2022
- Stricken: 21 September 2022
- Identification: IMO number: 9218210; MMSI number: 368026000; Callsign: NBHG
- Status: Stricken, in Ready Reserve Force

General characteristics
- Class & type: Bob Hope-class roll on roll off vehicle cargo ship
- Displacement: 35,500 t.(lt); 62096 t.(fl)
- Length: 951 ft 5 in (290.0 m)
- Beam: 106 ft (32.3 m)
- Draft: 34 ft 10 in (10.6 m) maximum
- Propulsion: 4 × Colt Pielstick 10 PC4.2 V diesels; 65,160 hp(m) (47.89 MW)
- Speed: 24 knots (44 km/h)
- Capacity: 300,000 sq ft (28,000 m^{2}); 49,991 sq ft (4,644.3 m^{2}) deck cargo
- Complement: 26 reduced / up to 45 full, civilian mariners; 50 US Navy personnel

USNS Benavidez (T-AKR-306) was a Bob Hope-class roll on roll off vehicle cargo ship of the United States Navy. She was built by Northrop Grumman Ship Systems, New Orleans and delivered to the Navy on 10 September 2003. They assigned her to the United States Department of Defense's Military Sealift Command. Benavidez is named for Medal of Honor recipient Master Sergeant Roy P. Benavidez, and is one of 11 Surge LMSRs operated by a private company under contract to the Military Sealift Command. She was assigned to the MSC Atlantic surge force and is maintained in Ready Operational Status 4. On 21 September 2022, Benavidez left service and was stricken from the Naval Vessel Register.

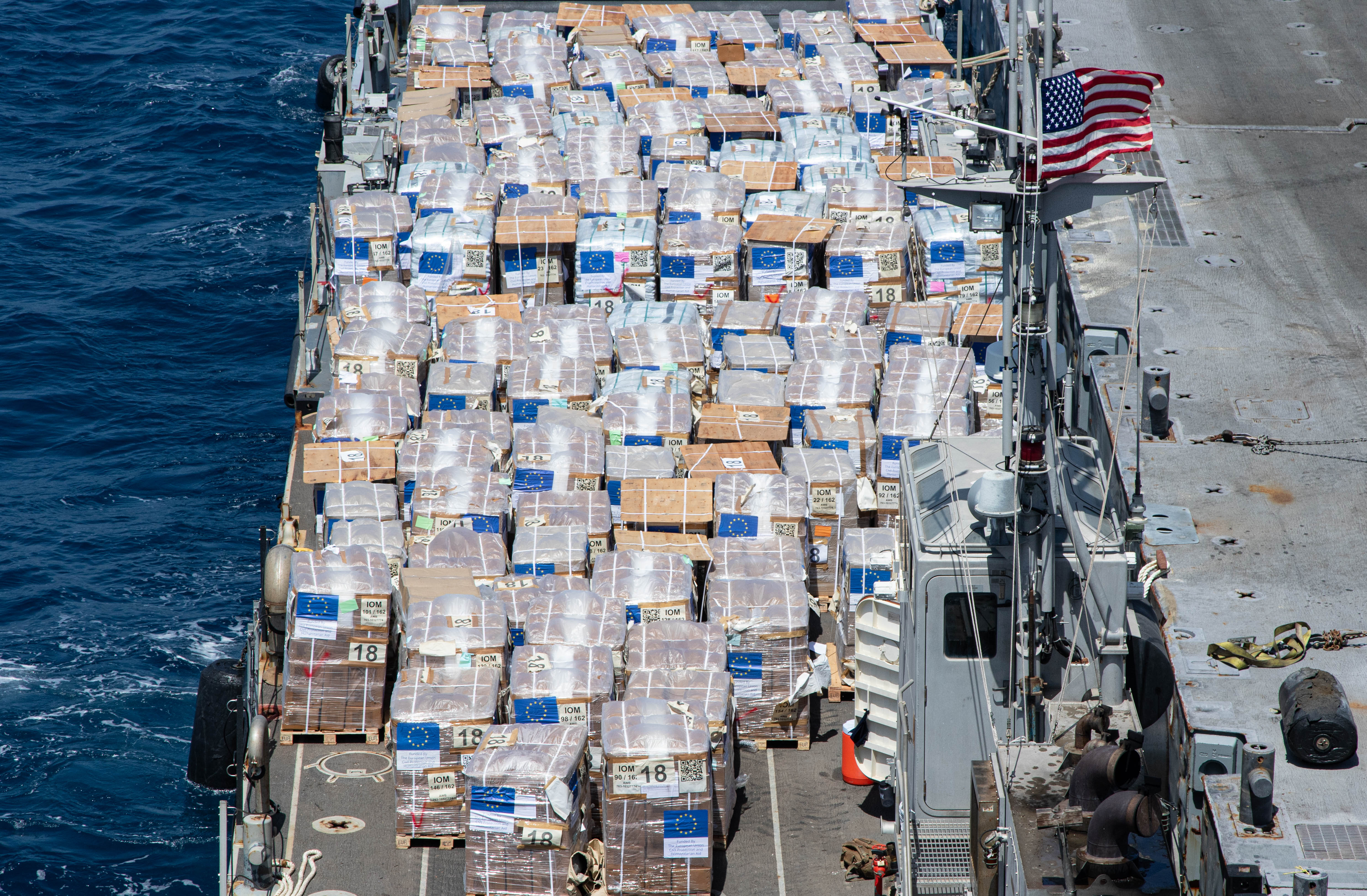
European Union humanitarian cargo is transported aboard the US Navy's MV Roy P. Benavidez to the American dock in Gaza. Photographed near the port of Ashdod, June 6, 2024.

In March, 2024, she was designated to assist in construction of the Gaza floating pier.
