= DeWitt County, Texas =

County in Texas, United States

- County
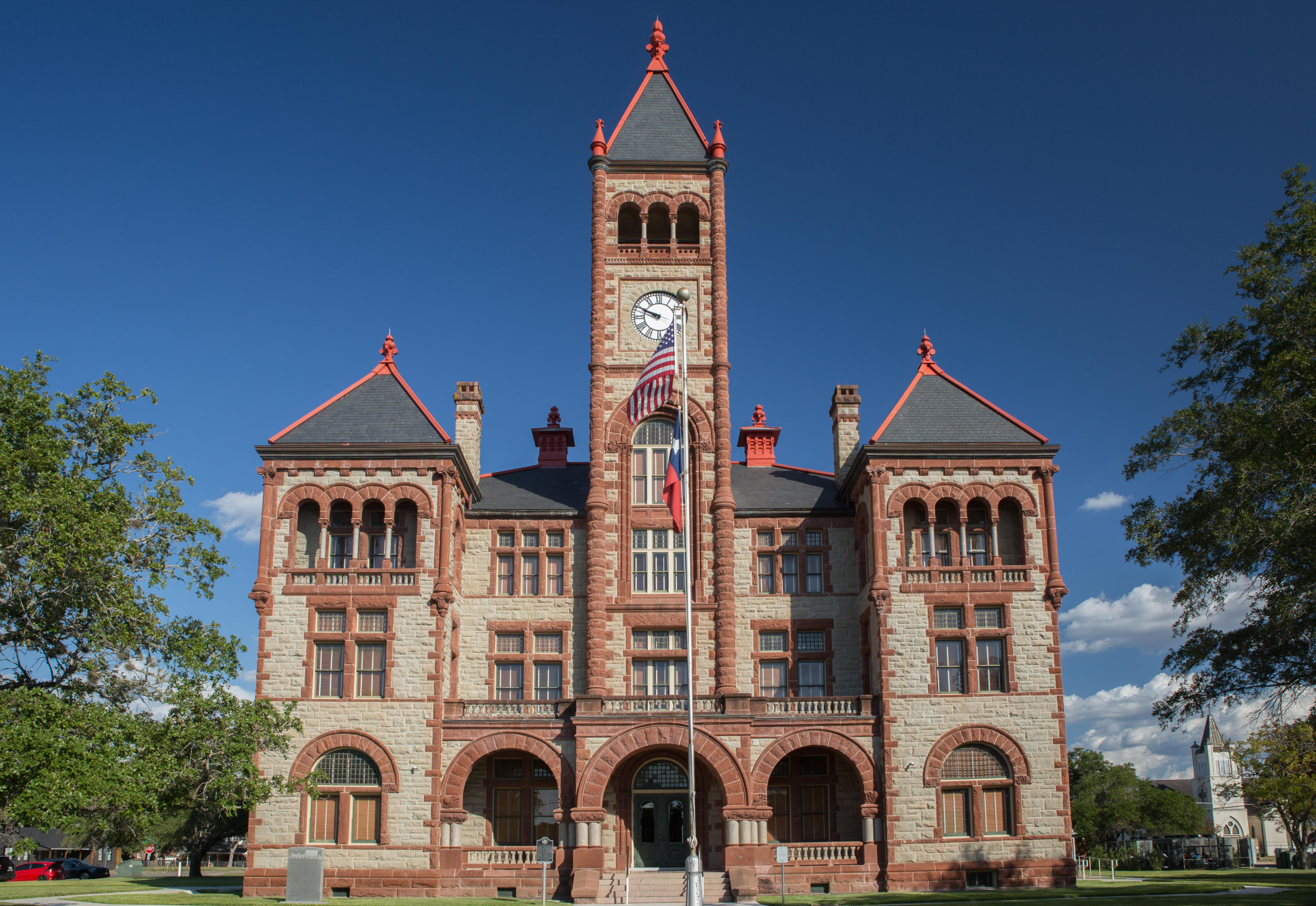
- The DeWitt County Courthouse located in Cuero. The courthouse was added to the National Register of Historic Places on May 6, 1971.

- Location within the U.S. state of Texas
- Coordinates: 29°05′N 97°22′W
- Country: United States
- State: Texas
- Founded: 1846
- Named for: Green DeWitt
- Seat: Cuero
- Largest city: Cuero

Area
  - Total: 910 sq mi (2,400 km^{2})
  - Land: 909 sq mi (2,350 km^{2})
  - Water: 1.5 sq mi (3.9 km^{2}) 0.2%

Population (2020)
  - Total: 19,824
  - Estimate (2025): 20,309 ▲
  - Density: 21.8/sq mi (8.4/km^{2})
- Time zone: UTC−6 (Central)
  - Summer (DST): UTC−5 (CDT)
- Congressional district: 27th
- Website: www.co.dewitt.tx.us

DeWitt County is a county located in the U.S. state of Texas. As of the 2020 census, its population was 19,824. The county seat is Cuero. The county was founded in 1846 and is named for Green DeWitt, who founded an early colony in Texas.

== History ==
=== Native Americans ===
Archeological digs indicate early habitation from the Paleo-Indians hunter-gatherers period. Later, Tonkawa, Aranamas, Tamiques, Karankawa, Tawakoni, Lipan Apache, and Comanche lived and hunted in the county.

=== Explorers ===
The first European visitors to the county are thought to have been Álvar Núñez Cabeza de Vaca, Alonso del Castillo Maldonado, Andrés Dorantes de Carranza, and his slave Estevanico of the ill-fated 1528 Narváez expedition. French explorer René Robert Cavelier, Sieur de La Salle is believed to have crossed the county on his way westward from Victoria County; and while La Bahia was a common route, no evidence of any settlements exist before the Anglo homesteaders.

=== County established and growth ===
In 1825, empresario Green DeWitt received a grant from the Coahuila y Tejas Legislature to settle 400 families. Between 1826 and 1831, settlers arrived from Tennessee, Kentucky, Missouri, and other Southern states.

A temporary county government was set up in 1846, with the county seat being Daniel Boone Friar's store at the junction of the La Bahía Road and the Gonzales-Victoria road. On November 28, 1850, Clinton became the county seat until Cuero became county seat in 1876.

Dewitt County voted in favor of secession from the Union, and sent several military units to serve. During Reconstruction, the county was occupied by the Fourth Corps, based at Victoria.

From April 1866 until December 1868, a subassistant commissioner of the Freedmen's Bureau served at Clinton. The community of Hopkinsville was established in 1872 by Henry Hopkins, freedman former slave of Judge Henry Clay Pleasants, the judge credited for ending the Sutton-Taylor feud. Residents began a school that was active until 1956 and established the Antioch Baptist Church.

The notorious Sutton–Taylor feud began as a Reconstruction-era county law enforcement issue between the Taylor family and lawman William E. Sutton. It eventually involved both the Taylor and Sutton families, the Texas State Police, the Texas Rangers, and John Wesley Hardin. The feud, which lasted a decade and cost 35 lives, has been called the longest and bloodiest in Texas history.

April 1, 1866, marked the first cattle drive on the Chisholm Trail, which originated at Cardwell's Flat, near the present Cuero. The coming of the railroads eliminated the need for the Chisholm Trail. Dewitt's first rail line, the Gulf, Western Texas and Pacific, extended to San Antonio. The San Antonio and Aransas Pass Railway, was the second line in the county. In 1907 the Galveston, Harrisburg and San Antonio Railway came through Dewitt. In 1925, the three lines came under the control of the Southern Pacific lines and operated as the Texas and New Orleans Railroad. Passenger service continued until November 1950.

The United States Army Air Corps opened Cuero Field, serving 290 cadets, at Cuero Municipal Airport as a pilot flight school in 1941. The school was deactivated in 1944.

Cuero and its large turkey-growing industry bills itself as the "Turkey Capital of the World". The turkey industry in Cuero began large-scale operations in 1908. Much like ranchers had cattle drives, Cuero poultry growers drove their turkeys down Main Street to the local packing plant. Each year, the crowds grew to watch the sight and sound of upwards of 20,000 turkeys going through town. The first annual Cuero Turkey Trot celebration began in 1912, complete with the "Turkey Trot" dance music of the era. By the 1970s, the event had become a 3-day typical Texas celebration with parades, live entertainment, food booths, and street dances.

== Geography ==
According to the U.S. Census Bureau, the county has a total area of 910 square miles (2,400 km^{2}), of which 1.5 sq mi (3.9 km^{2}) (0.2%) are covered by water.

=== Major highways ===
- U.S. Highway 77
- U.S. Highway 87
- U.S. Highway 77 Alternate/U.S. Highway 183
- State Highway 72
- State Highway 119
- Loop 105

=== Adjacent counties ===
- Lavaca County (northeast)
- Victoria County (southeast)
- Goliad County (south)
- Karnes County (southwest)
- Gonzales County (northwest)

== Demographics ==
Historical population
Census	Pop.	Note	%±
1850	1,716		—
1860	5,108		197.7%
1870	6,443		26.1%
1880	10,082		56.5%
1890	14,307		41.9%
1900	21,311		49.0%
1910	23,501		10.3%
1920	27,971		19.0%
1930	27,441		−1.9%
1940	24,935		−9.1%
1950	22,973		−7.9%
1960	20,683		−10.0%
1970	18,660		−9.8%
1980	18,903		1.3%
1990	18,840		−0.3%
2000	20,013		6.2%
2010	20,097		0.4%
2020	19,824		−1.4%
2025 (est.)	20,309	▲	2.4%
U.S. Decennial Census; 1850–2010 2020

=== 2020 census ===
As of the 2020 census, the county had a population of 19,824. The median age was 42.8 years; 22.2% of residents were under 18 and 21.0% were 65 or older. For every 100 females, there were 109.0 males, and for every 100 females 18 and over, there were 109.4 males 18 and over.

The racial makeup of the county was 67.2% White, 8.4% Black or African American, 0.6% American Indian and Alaska Native, 0.4% Asian, <0.1% Native Hawaiian and Pacific Islander, 12.6% from some other race, and 10.8% from two or more races. Hispanic or Latino residents of any race comprised 34.8% of the population.

About 48.6% of residents lived in urban areas, while 51.4% lived in rural areas.

Of the 7,315 households in the county, 30.7% had children under 18 living in them, 49.3% were married-couple households, 18.8% were households with a male householder and no spouse or partner present, and 26.2% were households with a female householder and no spouse or partner present. About 28.0% of all households were made up of individuals, and 15.2% had someone living alone who was 65 or older.

The county had 9,182 housing units, of which 20.3% were vacant. Among occupied housing units, 72.4% were owner-occupied and 27.6% were renter-occupied. The homeowner vacancy rate was 2.4% and the rental vacancy rate was 11.3%.

=== Racial and ethnic composition ===
DeWitt County, Texas – Racial and ethnic composition Note: the US Census treats Hispanic/Latino as an ethnic category. This table excludes Latinos from the racial categories and assigns them to a separate category. Hispanics/Latinos may be of any race.
Race / Ethnicity (NH = Non-Hispanic)	Pop 1980	Pop 1990	Pop 2000	Pop 2010	Pop 2020	% 1980	% 1990	% 2000	% 2010	% 2020
White alone (NH)	12,467	12,265	12,168	11,482	10,854	65.95%	65.10%	60.80%	57.13%	54.75%
Black or African American alone (NH)	2,025	1,956	2,158	1,781	1,557	10.71%	10.38%	10.78%	8.86%	7.85%
Native American or Alaska Native alone (NH)	9	15	63	43	32	0.05%	0.08%	0.31%	0.21%	0.16%
Asian alone (NH)	8	7	34	44	70	0.04%	0.04%	0.17%	0.22%	0.35%
Native Hawaiian or Pacific Islander alone (NH)	x	x	5	0	2	x	x	0.02%	0.00%	0.01%
Other race alone (NH)	31	30	7	96	35	0.16%	0.16%	0.03%	0.48%	0.18%
Multiracial (NH)	x	x	126	149	384	x	x	0.63%	0.74%	1.94%
Hispanic or Latino (any race)	4,363	4,567	5,452	6,502	6,890	23.08%	24.24%	27.24%	32.35%	34.76%
Total	18,903	18,840	20,013	20,097	19,824	100.00%	100.00%	100.00%	100.00%	100.00%

=== 2000 census ===
As of the census of 2000, 20,013 people, 7,207 households, and 5,131 families were residing in the county. The population density was 22 people/mi^{2} (8.5 people/km^{2}). The 8,756 housing units had an average density of 10 per square mile (3.9/km^{2}). The racial makeup of the county was 76.4% White, 11.0% African American, 0.5% Native American, 0.2% Asian, 10.0% from other races, and 1.8% from two or more races. About 27.2% of the population were Hispanics or Latinos of any race; 28.0% were of German and 6.1% American ancestry according to Census 2000, and 77.2% spoke English, 20.5% Spanish, and 1.6% German as their first language.

Of the 7,207 households, 31.0% had children under 18 living with them, 55.1% were married couples living together, 11.8% had a female householder with no husband present, and 28.8% were not families. Around 26.4% of all households were made up of individuals, and 15.0% had someone living alone who was 65 or older. The average household size was 2.53, and the average family size was 3.04.

In the county, the age distribution was 23.8% under 18, 7.0% from 18 to 24, 27.1% from 25 to 44, 23.3% from 45 to 64, and 18.9% who were 65 or older. The median age was 40 years. For every 100 females, there were 105.5 males. For every 100 females 18 and over, there were 105.2 males.

The median income in the county for a household was $28,714 and for a family was $33,513. Males had a median income of $27,134 versus $18,370 for females. The per capita income for the county was $14,780. About 15.3% of families and 19.6% of the population were below the poverty line, including 25.5% of those under 18 and 16.5% of those 65 or over.

== Education ==
Dewitt County is served by:

- Cuero Independent School District
- Meyersville Independent School District
- Nordheim Independent School District
- Westhoff Independent School District
- Yoakum Independent School District
- Yorktown Independent School District

Of the six school districts, four have high schools. Meyersville ISD and Westhoff ISD students transfer to one of the other high schools in the county. Those high schools are:

- Cuero High School
- Yorktown High School (Texas)
- Nordheim High School

All of the county is in the service area of Victoria College.

== Communities ==
=== Cities ===
- Cuero (county seat)
- Nordheim
- Yoakum (partly in Lavaca County)
- Yorktown

=== Unincorporated communities ===
- Arneckeville
- Concrete
- Hochheim
- Lindenau
- Meyersville
- Pearl City
- Thomaston
- Westhoff

=== Ghost town ===
- Clinton

== Politics ==
United States presidential election results for DeWitt County, Texas
Year	Republican		Democratic		Third party(ies)	
Year	No.	%	No.	%	No.	%
1912	219	14.96%	1,081	73.84%	164	11.20%
1916	1,068	49.74%	1,056	49.18%	23	1.07%
1920	1,277	38.59%	971	29.34%	1,061	32.06%
1924	868	22.90%	2,131	56.21%	792	20.89%
1928	1,142	41.66%	1,594	58.15%	5	0.18%
1932	309	8.78%	3,206	91.05%	6	0.17%
1936	616	23.67%	1,977	75.98%	9	0.35%
1940	1,735	45.77%	2,056	54.23%	0	0.00%
1944	1,879	44.88%	1,884	45.00%	424	10.13%
1948	1,612	44.20%	1,808	49.57%	227	6.22%
1952	4,075	67.71%	1,934	32.14%	9	0.15%
1956	3,401	70.14%	1,435	29.59%	13	0.27%
1960	2,763	54.94%	2,253	44.80%	13	0.26%
1964	2,283	40.97%	3,286	58.96%	4	0.07%
1968	2,589	49.37%	1,871	35.68%	784	14.95%
1972	3,755	72.96%	1,357	26.36%	35	0.68%
1976	2,754	51.70%	2,540	47.68%	33	0.62%
1980	3,450	61.83%	2,044	36.63%	86	1.54%
1984	4,401	69.95%	1,882	29.91%	9	0.14%
1988	3,628	58.00%	2,579	41.23%	48	0.77%
1992	3,238	48.11%	2,127	31.60%	1,365	20.28%
1996	3,577	58.03%	2,074	33.65%	513	8.32%
2000	4,541	73.44%	1,570	25.39%	72	1.16%
2004	5,100	75.76%	1,610	23.92%	22	0.33%
2008	4,888	73.77%	1,716	25.90%	22	0.33%
2012	5,122	77.16%	1,467	22.10%	49	0.74%
2016	5,519	80.64%	1,163	16.99%	162	2.37%
2020	6,567	80.89%	1,494	18.40%	57	0.70%
2024	6,515	83.26%	1,270	16.23%	40	0.51%

United States Senate election results for DeWitt County, Texas1
Year	Republican		Democratic		Third party(ies)	
Year	No.	%	No.	%	No.	%
2024	6,240	80.52%	1,392	17.96%	118	1.52%

United States Senate election results for DeWitt County, Texas2
Year	Republican		Democratic		Third party(ies)	
Year	No.	%	No.	%	No.	%
2020	6,399	81.13%	1,384	17.55%	104	1.32%

Texas Gubernatorial election results for DeWitt County
Year	Republican		Democratic		Third party(ies)	
Year	No.	%	No.	%	No.	%
2022	5,151	84.99%	878	14.49%	32	0.53%

== Notable people ==
- James Dahlman, eight-term Omaha mayor from 1906 to 1930, was born in DeWitt County.
- Harlon Block, one of the Marines pictured in Raising the Flag on Iwo Jima, was born in Yorktown.
- Roy Benavidez, Medal of Honor recipient of the Studies and Observations Group of the United States Army, was born in Lindenau.

== See also ==
- List of museums in South Texas
- National Register of Historic Places listings in DeWitt County, Texas
- Recorded Texas Historic Landmarks in DeWitt County
