= Nordheim Independent School District =

School district in Texas, United States

Address
- 500 North Broadway Nordheim, Texas, 78141; United States

District information
- Grades: PK-12
- Schools: 1
- NCES District ID: 4832880

Students and staff
- Students: 126
- Teachers: 17.00 (on an FTE basis)
- Student–teacher ratio: 7.41:1

Other information
- Website: www.nordheimisd.org

Nordheim Independent School District is a public independent school district based in Nordheim, Texas (USA).

Located in DeWitt County, a small portion of the district extends into Karnes County.

Nordheim ISD has one school that serves students in grades kindergarten through twelve.

In 2010, the school district was rated "exemplary" by the Texas Education Agency.

== Schools ==
- Nordheim High School
