= Arneckeville, Texas =

Unincorporated community in Texas, US

Coordinates: 28°59′33″N 97°16′20″W

Arneckeville is an unincorporated community in DeWitt County, Texas.

== History ==
The first settlement at Arneckeville was made in 1859 by U. Barbara Arnecke and others. The community was originally built up chiefly by German immigrants. A post office was established at Arneckeville in 1872, and remained in operation until 1954.

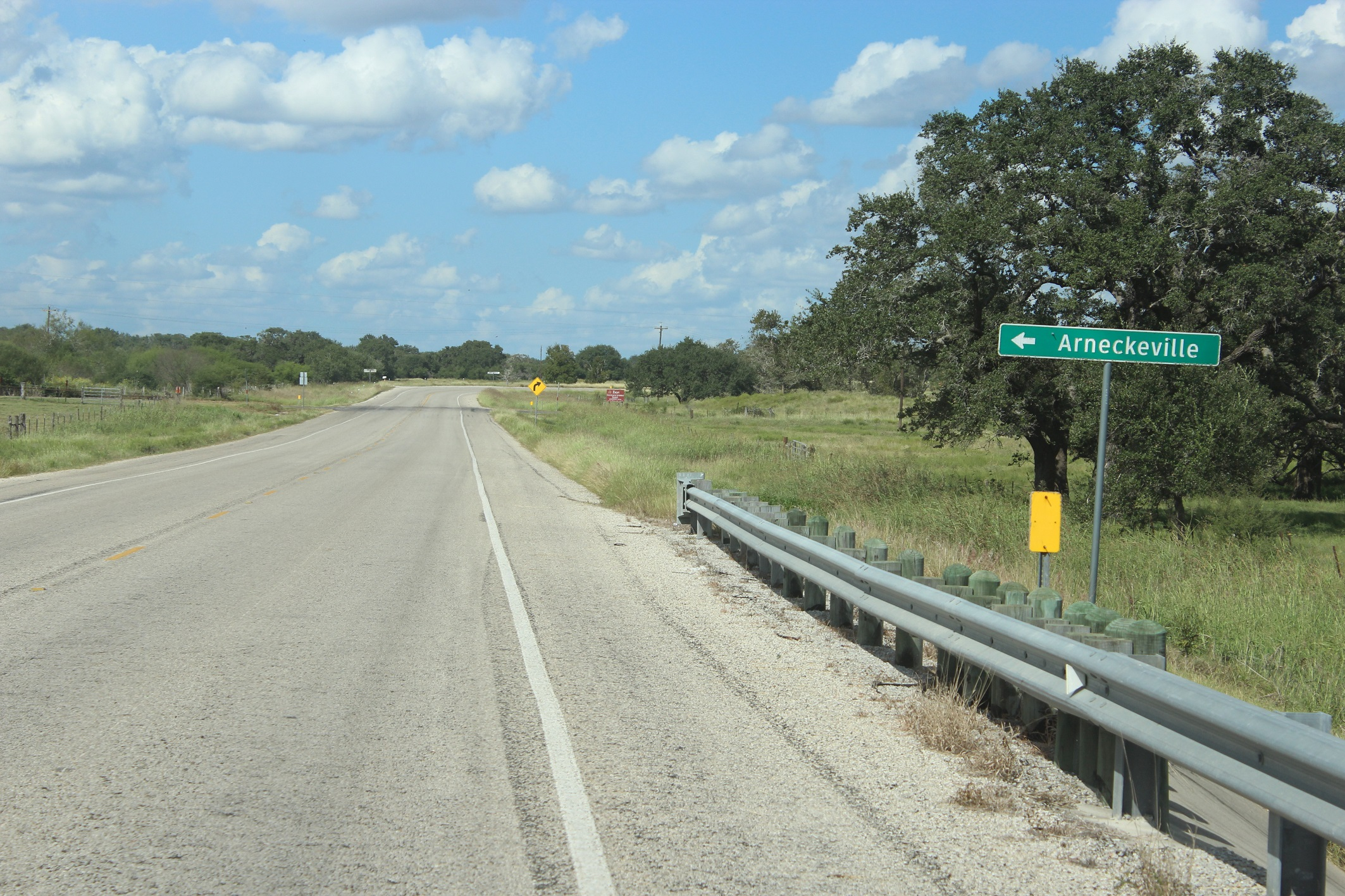

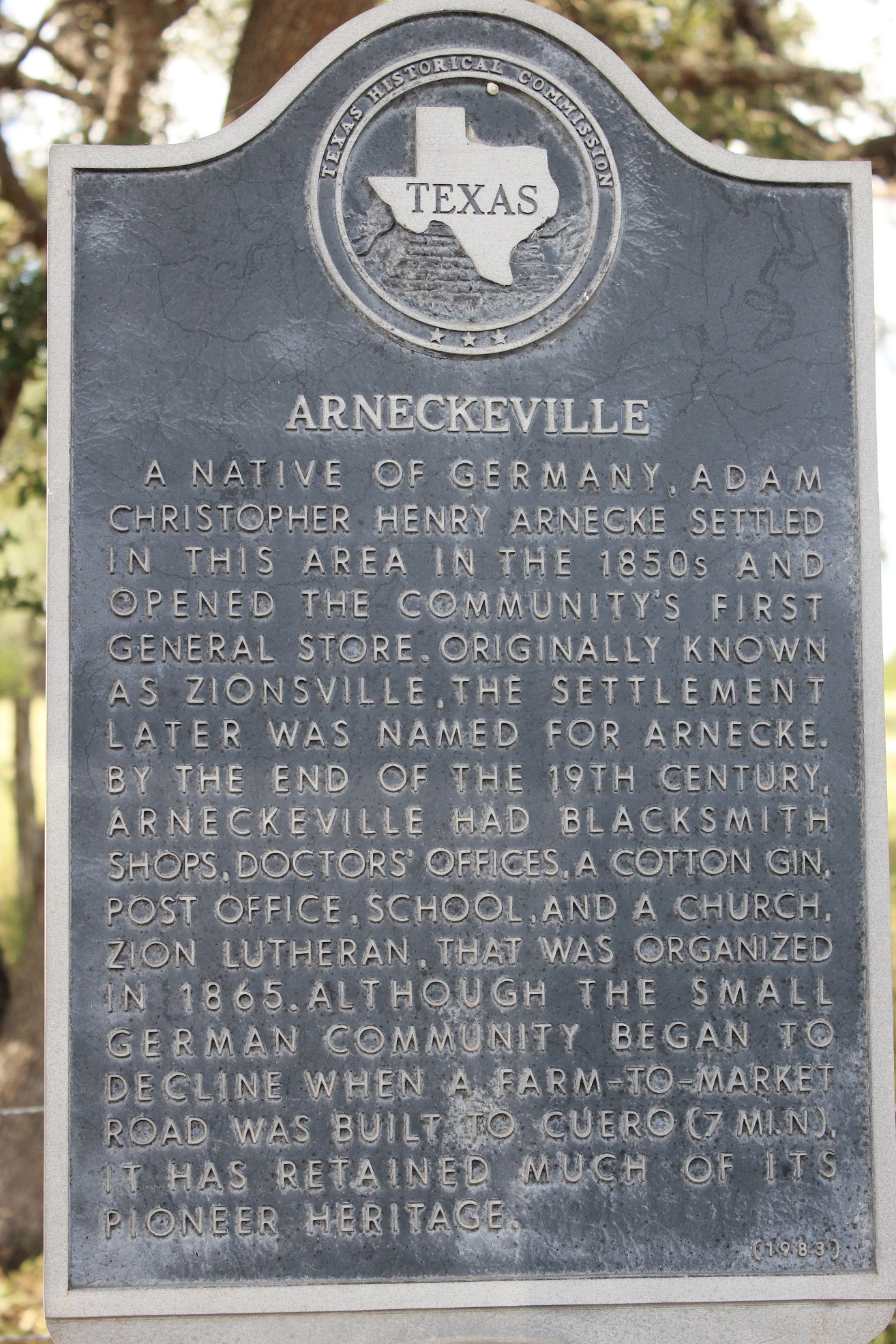
