= Nordheim, Texas =

- City
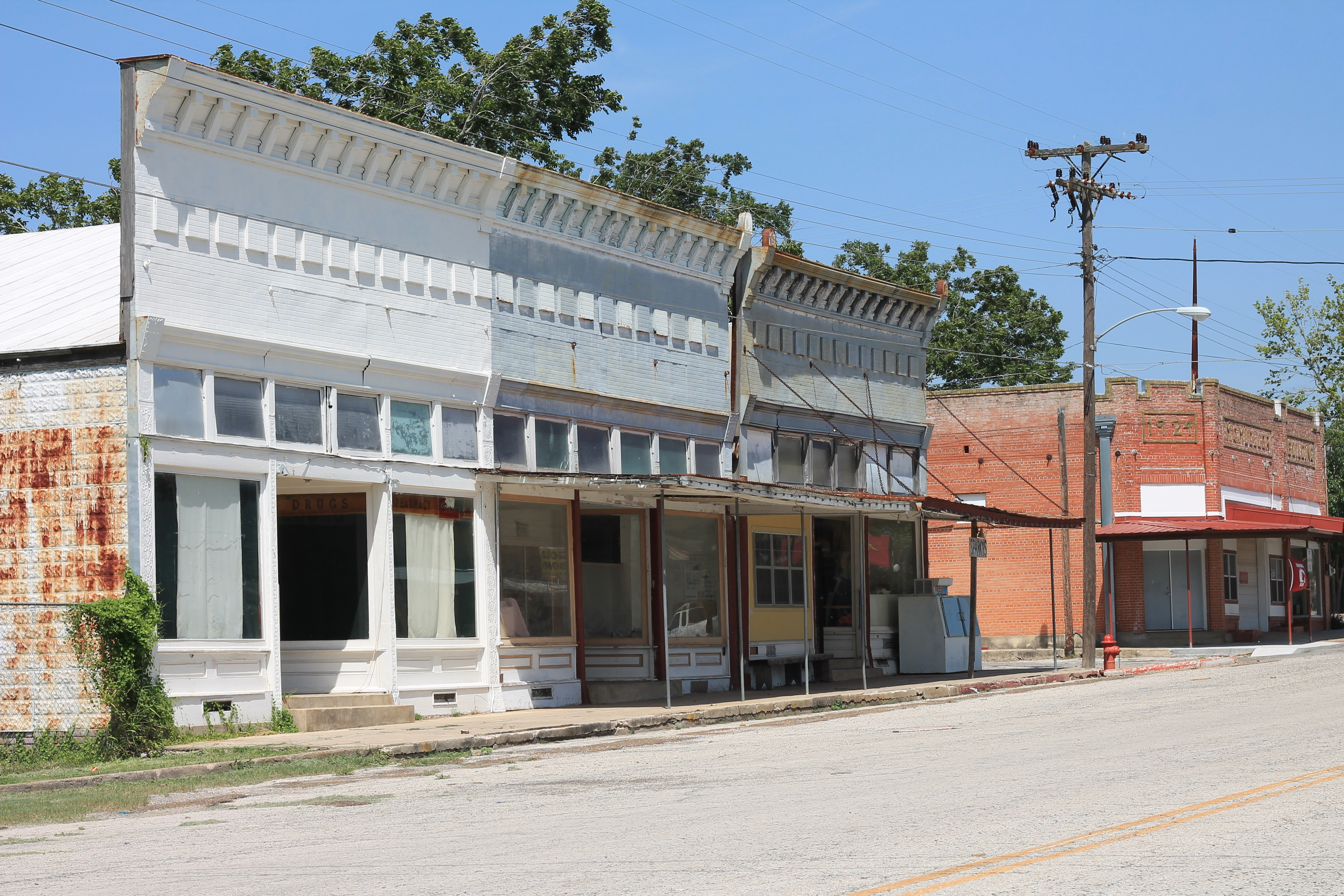

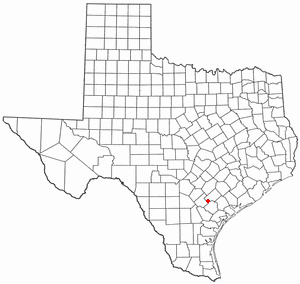
- Location of Nordheim, Texas

- Coordinates: 28°55′24″N 97°36′48″W
- Country: United States
- State: Texas
- County: DeWitt

Area
  - Total: 0.50 sq mi (1.29 km^{2})
  - Land: 0.50 sq mi (1.29 km^{2})
  - Water: 0 sq mi (0.00 km^{2})
- Elevation: 404 ft (123 m)

Population (2020)
  - Total: 336
  - Density: 609.2/sq mi (235.22/km^{2})
- Time zone: UTC-6 (Central (CST))
  - Summer (DST): UTC-5 (CDT)
- ZIP code: 78141
- Area code: 361
- FIPS code: 48-51792
- GNIS feature ID: 1377604
- Website: cityofnordheim.com

Nordheim is a city in DeWitt County, Texas, United States. The population was 336 at the 2020 census.

== History ==
Nordheim was founded in 1895 as a railway siding known as Weldon Switch along the San Antonio and Aransas Pass Railway. The area became a settlement primarily of German immigrants. H. Runge and Company—owning much of the surrounding area—along with other local figures laid out the townsite. In 1896, the community was renamed after Nordheim, Baden-Württemberg the German hometown of Runge’s president, William Frobese.

By the turn of the century, the town had developed essential services and infrastructure, including stores, a cotton gin, a school, a Lutheran church, and telephone and telegraph connections. The arrival of the Davy Crockett passenger train line in 1901 allowed for the construction of a town passenger depot. One year later, in 1902 a local newspaper named The Nordheim View was launched. A hotel and a bank soon followed, and Nordheim became a hub for shipping cotton, poultry, and other crops. Social life centered around German clubs and organizations such as the Schuetzen Verein shooting club and the Nordheim Brass Band. Beginning in 1906, Local poultry growers and cotton, truck-crop, and lumber shippers were garnering praise in the nearby town newspaper the Cuero Star, describing German farmers of Nordheim as a “better class”. Between 1902 and 1915 the community’s population climbed significantly—alongside eight saloons—prompting incorporation in 1917 when state law restricted unincorporated towns from licensing alcohol outlets. In 1922 Ku Klux Klan from nearby town Runge had threatened to violently protest the Nordheim Silver Jubilee, in reaction to the presence of alcohol and gambling. Nordheim locals had responded claiming they would be “ready to meet the challenge”, causing the Ku Klux Klan back down.

The Nordheim Independent School District formed in 1927 through the consolidation of rural schools—full accreditation followed by 1946. On May 6, 1930, a cyclone struck, killing and injuring several townspeople; emergency supplies arrived by air. Though the Great Depression and storm damage led to business closures and an exodus of residents, the 1934 discovery of oil and gas provided new employment. Through the mid-20th century, Nordheim slowly rebuilt its commercial base and residential neighborhoods. In 1952 the local paper relocated and became the DeWitt County View, printed in Yorktown.

In the decades that followed, the town’s population and number of businesses declined; its last cotton gin closed in 1970. Yet German cultural traditions endured: the Schuetzen Verein hall remained in use into the late 1980s, May Fest and Harvest Fest continued, and the brass band—long lauded as Texas’s oldest continuously active German ensemble—played until shortly after 1972. A museum honoring local history opened in the fire station in April 1986. The town also gained cinematic fame when Paris, Texas filmed scenes there in 1984.

== Geography ==
Nordheim is located in southwestern DeWitt County at 28°55′24″N 97°36′48″W (28.923345, –97.613449). Texas State Highway 72 forms the southern border of the city and leads northeastward 24 miles (39 km) to Cuero, the county seat, and southwest 17 miles (27 km) to Kenedy.

According to the United States Census Bureau, Nordheim has a total area of 0.50 square miles (1.3 km^{2}), all land.

== Demographics ==
Historical population
Census	Pop.	Note	%±
1920	443		—
1930	400		−9.7%
1940	411		2.8%
1950	477		16.1%
1960	407		−14.7%
1970	369		−9.3%
1980	369		0.0%
1990	344		−6.8%
2000	323		−6.1%
2010	307		−5.0%
2020	336		9.4%
U.S. Decennial Census

=== 2020 census ===
As of the 2020 census, Nordheim had a population of 336. The median age was 44.8 years. 22.6% of residents were under the age of 18 and 22.0% of residents were 65 years of age or older. For every 100 females there were 87.7 males, and for every 100 females age 18 and over there were 94.0 males age 18 and over.

0.0% of residents lived in urban areas, while 100.0% lived in rural areas.

There were 140 households in Nordheim, of which 37.9% had children under the age of 18 living in them. Of all households, 40.7% were married-couple households, 27.9% were households with a male householder and no spouse or partner present, and 27.9% were households with a female householder and no spouse or partner present. About 22.9% of all households were made up of individuals and 15.0% had someone living alone who was 65 years of age or older.

There were 171 housing units, of which 18.1% were vacant. The homeowner vacancy rate was 0.0% and the rental vacancy rate was 3.3%.

Nordheim racial composition as of 2020 (NH = Non-Hispanic) (Note: Note: the US Census treats Hispanic/Latino as an ethnic category. This table excludes Latinos from the racial categories and assigns them to a separate category. Hispanics/Latinos can be of any race.)
Race	Number	Percentage
White (NH)	189	56.25%
Black or African American (NH)	7	2.08%
Native American or Alaska Native (NH)	1	0.3%
Asian (NH)	1	0.3%
Some Other Race (NH)	1	0.3%
Mixed/Multi-Racial (NH)	11	3.27%
Hispanic or Latino	126	37.5%
Total	336	

=== 2000 census ===
As of the 2000 census, there were 323 people, 136 households, and 87 families residing in the city. The population density was 680.7 inhabitants per square mile (262.8/km^{2}). There were 170 housing units at an average density of 358.3 per square mile (138.3/km^{2}). The racial makeup of the city was 80.50% White, 1.55% Native American, 17.34% from other races, and 0.62% from two or more races. Hispanic or Latino of any race were 39.32% of the population.

There were 136 households, out of which 24.3% had children under the age of 18 living with them, 52.2% were married couples living together, 7.4% had a female householder with no husband present, and 36.0% were non-families. 32.4% of all households were made up of individuals, and 25.7% had someone living alone who was 65 years of age or older. The average household size was 2.38 and the average family size was 3.01.

In the city, the population was spread out, with 22.0% under the age of 18, 9.0% from 18 to 24, 20.4% from 25 to 44, 21.7% from 45 to 64, and 26.9% who were 65 years of age or older. The median age was 43 years. For every 100 females, there were 78.5 males. For every 100 females age 18 and over, there were 83.9 males.

The median income for a household in the city was $38,125, and the median income for a family was $43,438. Males had a median income of $30,536 versus $22,813 for females. The per capita income for the city was $14,125. About 3.2% of families and 9.8% of the population were below the poverty line, including 17.8% of those under age 18 and 11.5% of those age 65 or over.

== Education ==
Nordheim is served by the Nordheim Independent School District.

== In the media ==
Some of the scenes in the movie Paris, Texas were filmed at the Broadway Bar in Nordheim.

== Notable person ==
- Santiago J. Erevia, Medal of Honor recipient; was born in Nordheim
