= Lindenau, Texas =

Unincorporated community in Texas, US

Coordinates: 29°07′04″N 97°22′15″W

Lindenau is an unincorporated community in DeWitt County, in the U.S. state of Texas.

== History ==
Lindenau was founded in 1891. The community was originally built up chiefly by German immigrants. A post office was established at Lindenau in 1895, and remained in operation until 1947.
