= Westhoff, Texas =

- Unincorporated community
- Location within the state of Texas Westhoff (the United States)
- Coordinates: 29°11′42″N 97°28′16″W
- Country: United States
- State: Texas
- County: DeWitt
- Time zone: UTC-6 (Central (CST))
  - Summer (DST): UTC-5 (CDT)
- ZIP code: 77994
- Area code: 830

Westhoff is an unincorporated community in northwestern DeWitt County, Texas, United States. The population of the town peaked at near 500 in the mid-1920s, and since the 1960s most official documents list the town population at 410, where it remained as of 2000.

== History ==
Westhoff was originally called Bello, and under the latter name was laid out in 1906 when the Galveston, Harrisburg and San Antonio Railway was extended to that point. The present name Westhoff was adopted in 1909 in honor of William Westhoff. The town suffered a serious fire in 1913. A post office has been in operation at Westhoff since 1906.

== Education ==
Westhoff students may attend Westhoff Independent School District.

== Climate ==
The climate in this area is characterized by hot, humid summers and generally mild to cool winters. According to the Köppen Climate Classification system, Westhoff has a humid subtropical climate, abbreviated "Cfa" on climate maps.
