= Pearl City High School =

Pearl City High School can refer to:

- Pearl City High School (Illinois) in Pearl City, Illinois
- Pearl City High School (Hawaii) in Honolulu County, Hawaii
