= Pearl City, Texas =

- Unincorporated community
- Location within the state of Texas Pearl City (the United States)
- Coordinates: 29°18′52″N 97°14′38″W
- Country: United States
- State: Texas
- County: DeWitt
- Time zone: UTC-6 (Central (CST))
  - Summer (DST): UTC-5 (CDT)

Pearl City is a small unincorporated community in DeWitt County, Texas, United States, at the intersection of State Highway 111 and Farm to Market Road 951, just west of Yoakum and 191 miles west of Houston.

== History ==
The community was named after the Pearl Brewing Company's Pearl beer.

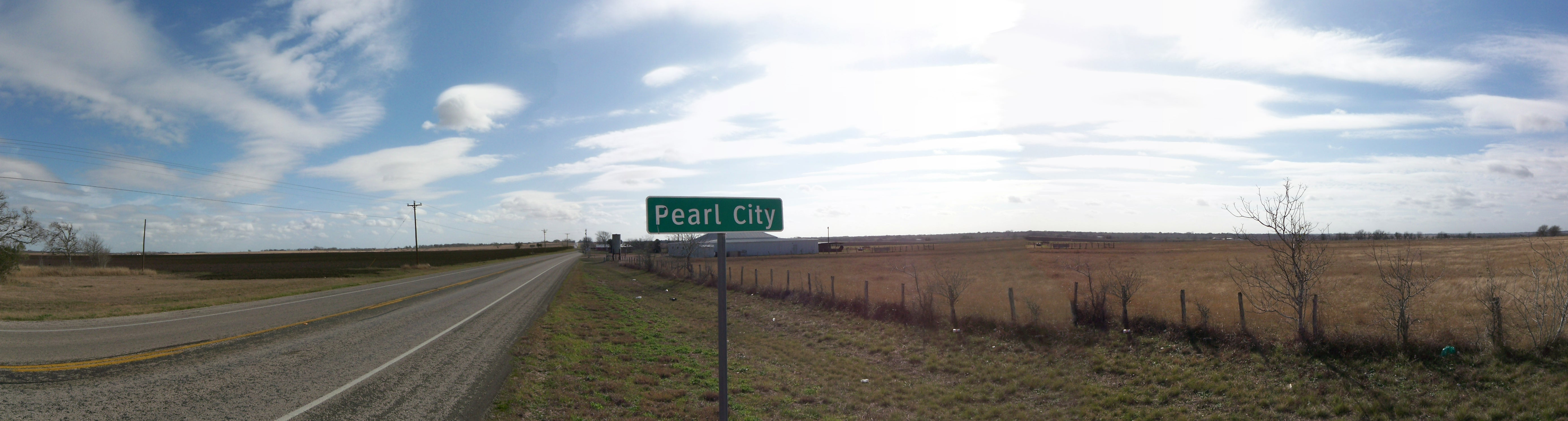
Panoramic photo of Pearl City
