= Westhoff Independent School District =

School district in Texas, United States

Address
- 244 Lynch Street Westhoff, Texas, 77994; United States

District information
- Grades: PK–8
- Schools: 1
- NCES District ID: 4845240

Students and staff
- Students: 88
- Teachers: 7.79 (on an FTE basis)
- Student–teacher ratio: 11.30:1

Other information
- Website: www.westhoffisd.org

Westhoff Independent School District is a public school district based in the community of Westhoff, Texas, United States.

The district operates one school serving prekindergarten through grade 8.

The school was founded in 1908 (when the community was called "Bello"). In 1950, the Lindenau and Wallis Ranch schools were consolidated into the Westhoff Rural School District as a result of state law passed; in 1978, the district became an independent district.

In 2009, the school district was rated "recognized" by the Texas Education Agency.
