= National Register of Historic Places listings in Burnet County, Texas =

Location of Burnet County in Texas

This is a list of the National Register of Historic Places listings in Burnet County, Texas.

This is intended to be a complete list of properties and districts listed on the National Register of Historic Places in Burnet County, Texas. There are two districts and six individual properties listed on the National Register in the county. Two properties and one site within one district are designated as Recorded Texas Historic Landmarks.

This National Park Service list is complete through NPS recent listings posted September 26, 2025.

== Current listings ==
The publicly disclosed locations of National Register properties and districts may be seen in a mapping service provided.

	Name on the Register	Image	Date listed	Location	City or town	Description
1	Austin and Northwestern Railroad Historic District-Fairland to Llano	Austin and Northwestern Railroad Historic District-Fairland to Llano	October 6, 1997 (#97001161)	Roughly along RR tracks from Fairland to Llano; 30°38′52″N 98°17′44″W	Kingsland	Extends into Llano County
2	Briggs State Bank	Briggs State Bank	August 11, 2000 (#00000885)	176 S. Loop 308 (approx. 0.5 mi. N of jct. with US 183); 30°53′17″N 97°55′28″W	Briggs	Recorded Texas Historic Landmark
3	Burnet County Courthouse	Burnet County Courthouse	November 15, 2000 (#00001384)	220 S. Pierce St. 30°45′25″N 98°13′37″W	Burnet	
4	Krause Spring Site	Krause Spring Site	November 15, 1978 (#78002901)	Address restricted	Spicewood	
5	Louis Page Archeological Site	Louis Page Archeological Site	March 30, 1978 (#78002900)	Address restricted	Marble Falls	
6	Park Road 4 Historic District	Park Road 4 Historic District	February 7, 2011 (#10001221)	Park Road 4 from US 281 to TX 29 & Longhorn Cavern State Park; 30°42′18″N 98°20′09″W	Burnet vicinity	Includes Recorded Texas Historic Landmark
7	Roper Hotel	Roper Hotel	January 8, 1980 (#80004083)	707 3rd St. 30°34′16″N 98°16′31″W	Marble Falls	Recorded Texas Historic Landmark
8	State Highway 29 Bridge at the Colorado River	State Highway 29 Bridge at the Colorado River	October 10, 1996 (#96001116)	TX 29 at the Llano County line 30°44′53″N 98°23′54″W	Buchanan Dam	Extends into Llano County

== See also ==
- National Register of Historic Places listings in Texas
- Recorded Texas Historic Landmarks in Burnet County
