= Burnet County Courthouse =

- U.S. National Register of Historic Places
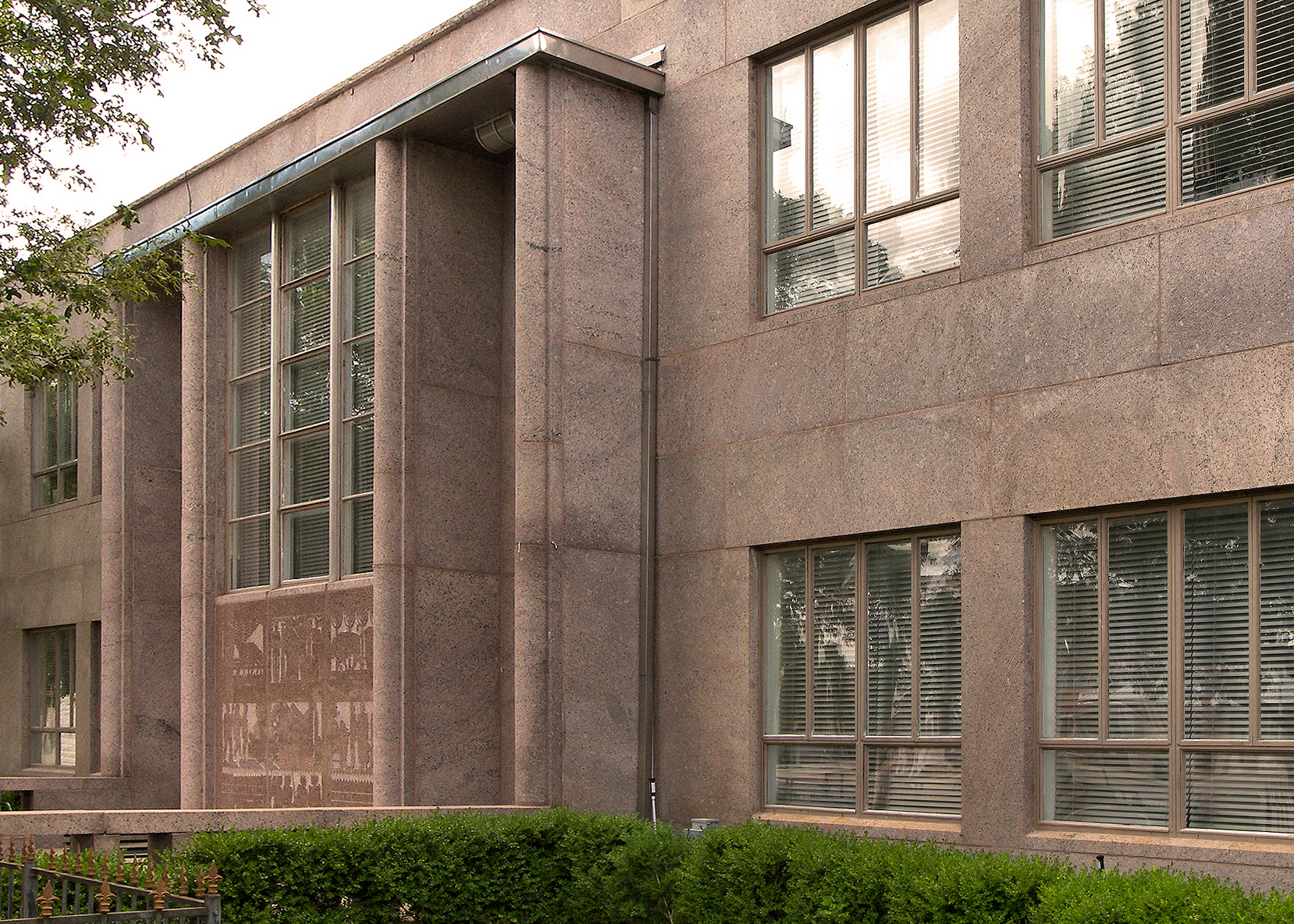
- Burnet County Courthouse in 2010.

- Location within Texas Location within the United States
- Location: 220 S. Pierce St., Burnet, Texas
- Coordinates: 30°45′24″N 98°13′37″W
- Area: less than one acre
- Built: 1937
- Architect: Milton Wirtz, et al.
- Architectural style: Moderne
- NRHP reference No.: 00001384
- Added to NRHP: November 15, 2000

The Burnet County Courthouse is a historic courthouse located in Burnet, Burnet County, Texas, United States. The Moderne style building was constructed in part with Works Progress Administration funds and is the third building to serve as the Burnet County Courthouse. Lewis Milton Wirtz of Columbus designed the structure. It was completed August 1, 1937 at a cost of approximately $135,000.

The first Burnet County Courthouse was a one-story frame building containing a courtroom, a jail and offices. In 1874, the courthouse, located on the southwestern corner of the present courthouse square, burned down. The second courthouse was constructed of limestone in 1875 and also housed a jail. When the 1875 courthouse fell into disrepair, the county decided to build a new courthouse.

The need for a new courthouse had long been evident in Burnett County, with various county offices having to be housed outside the courthouse due to space constraints.

The need for a new courthouse came to the forefront in 1934. In June of that year, a report of the Burnet County Grand Jury found that "the Tax Assessor and the Tax Collector are without a vault to protect the records of their offices," and noted that a fire could destroy valuable records. The grand jury recommended, since the two offices were set to be combined in to one in 1935, moving a men's restroom in the courthouse to accommodate the need for larger office space. In December of that year, Burnet Mayor W.C. Galloway proposed using government match-funding programs to construct a new courthouse.

The last week of November, 1935, the Works Progress Administration announced that $74,000 had been allocated for the construction of a new courthouse and jail repairs in Burnett County.

Because the courthouse was proposed as a Works Project Administration project, the local government of Burnet County was required to bear a portion of the costs. The county was required to come up with $74,000 to match with federal funds of $61,000. In order to raise these funds, the Burnet County Commissioners Court voted to hold an election to allow voters to decide if the county should sell bonds to come up with its portion of the funds necessary for the courthouse project. It was projected that the additional five-cent maintenance tax required to pay off the bonds would cost a property owner with $1,000 worth of property an additional fifty cents per year in taxes. The Burnett Bulletin editorialized in favor of the bonds.

The bond election for voters to approve $74,000 in bonds to be matched with federal funding of $61,000 for a total of $135,000 to build the new courthouse was conducted December 21, 1935.

The bond election passed by 81 votes, 401-320. 721 votes were cast. The box for the city of Burnett voted in favor of the bonds 236-30.

County offices moved out of the old courthouse, and crews began tearing it down during the week of February 13, 1936.

County Judge O.B. Zimmerman received the first installment check of $33,750 from the federal government for the courthouse project the week of April 2, 1936.

Southern Office Furniture Company was awarded an $8,49.53 bid to outfit the courthouse with furniture and equipment in early February, 1937.

The current Burnet County Courthouse is two-story and finished in polished pink granite veneer with scenes of Burnet County history and commerce etched in panels. The pink granite is the same material that was used on the Texas State Capitol.

An addition designed by Willis Environmental Engineering of Marble Falls was constructed on the rear of the courthouse in 1974. The building was added to the National Register of Historic Places on November 15, 2000.

== See also ==
- National Register of Historic Places listings in Burnet County, Texas
- Recorded Texas Historic Landmarks in Burnet County
- List of county courthouses in Texas
