= Sherwood Shores, Burnet County, Texas =

- Unincorporated community
- Location within Texas Location within the United States
- Coordinates: 30°35′37″N 98°21′32″W
- Country: United States
- State: Texas
- County: Burnet
- Elevation: 856 ft (261 m)
- Time zone: UTC-6 (Central (CST))
  - Summer (DST): UTC-5 (CDT)
- Area codes: 512 & 737
- GNIS feature ID: 1377753

Sherwood Shores refers to two distinct unincorporated communities in Burnet County, Texas, United States. Settled in the 1960s, the communities had an estimated population of 870 in 2000.

== Geography ==
Sherwood Shores is located in the Highland Lakes region in western Burnet County, 14 mi (23 km) southwest of Burnet on Lake Lyndon B. Johnson.

== Education ==
Sherwood Shores is served by the Marble Falls Independent School District. Elementary-age kids attend Highland Lakes Elementary in Granite Shoals.
