= Roper Hotel =

- U.S. National Register of Historic Places
- Recorded Texas Historic Landmark
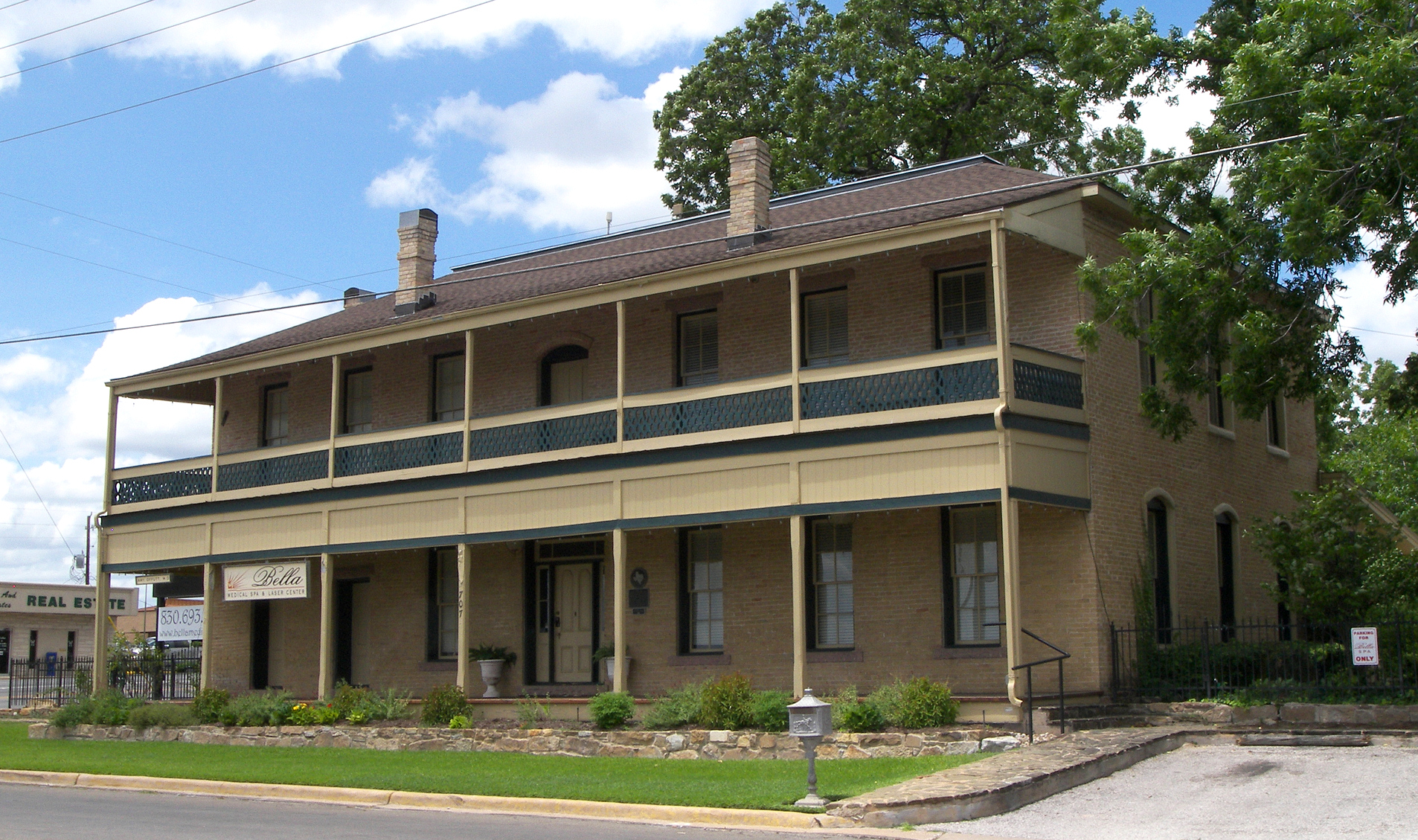
- Roper Hotel in 2010

- Location within Texas Location within the United States
- Location: US 281 and 3rd St., Marble Falls, Texas
- Coordinates: 30°34′16″N 98°16′31″W
- Area: less than one acre
- Built: 1888
- NRHP reference No.: 80004083
- RTHL No.: 9745

Significant dates
- Added to NRHP: January 8, 1980
- Designated RTHL: 1981

The Roper Hotel is located at 707 Third Street in the city of Marble Falls, county of Burnet, in the U.S. state of Texas. It was erected circa 1888. The hotel was designated a Recorded Texas Historic Landmark in 1981, and added to the National Register of Historic Places listings in Burnet County, Texas on January 8, 1980. The two-story structure was originally built by George and Elizabeth Roper. The building changed hands and names in 1926 and 1963, and is currently occupied by a medical clinic.

== See also ==
- National Register of Historic Places listings in Burnet County, Texas
- Recorded Texas Historic Landmarks in Burnet County
