= Spicewood, Texas =

- Unincorporated community
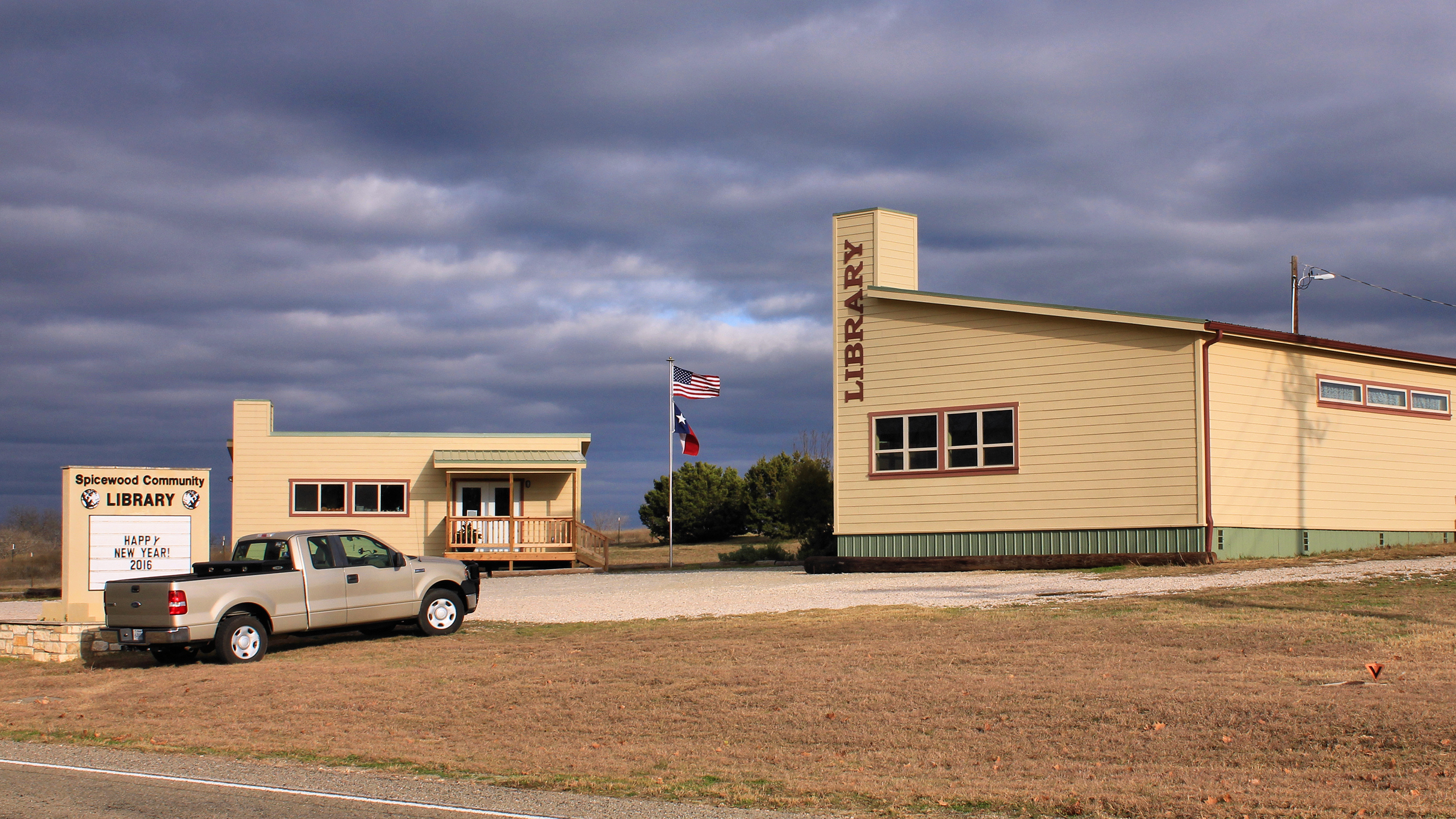
- Spicewood Community Library

- Location within Texas Location within the United States
- Coordinates: 30°28′32″N 98°09′23″W
- Country: United States
- State: Texas
- County: Burnet
- Elevation: 778 ft (237 m)
- Time zone: UTC-6 (Central (CST))
  - Summer (DST): UTC-5 (CDT)
- Postal code: 78669
- Area codes: 512 & 737
- GNIS feature ID: 1368896

Spicewood is an unincorporated community primarily in Burnet County but also in Travis County and Blanco County, Texas, United States. According to the Texas Almanac, the community had an estimated population of 2,000 in 2000. But in the 2011 census, the community had a population of 7,666. The community also extends towards Travis County off Highway 71.

The community-proper, located at the intersection of C.R. 404 and Spur 191, is home to a community center, a former two-room local schoolhouse that was closed after merging with Marble Falls ISD. The community also contains a non-denominational church and a Church of Christ and was formerly the home of BJ Cafe, reputed to have been an occasional favorite of Willie Nelson. The Cafe closed in 1990 and is now a private residence and auto repair shop.

In 2020, Willie Nelson was living on the Luck Ranch in Spicewood.

== Geography ==
Spicewood is located one mile north of State Highway 71 in southeastern Burnet and western Travis Counties, approximately nine miles southeast of Marble Falls. The nearest major city is Austin, located 35 miles southeast of Spicewood.

=== Climate ===
The climate in this area is characterized by hot, humid summers and generally mild to cool winters. According to the Köppen Climate Classification system, Spicewood has a humid subtropical climate, abbreviated "Cfa" on climate maps.

== History ==
Spicewood was established in the late 19th century, although many residents claim direct lineage from settlers in the early 19th century, many land deeds originating from "script" issued by the Republic of Texas and derived from Spanish land grants. The name possibly came from the "spicewood" timber that grew along nearby Little Cypress Creek. A post office opened in 1899, with James B. Pangle as its postmaster. The Spicewood post office itself moved (2000) from its original location in Spicewood, one mile south to Hollingsworth Corner, and now serves a 100 mi^{2} area in three counties, Burnet, Blanco, and Travis, leading many served to incorrectly believe they actually "live in" old Spicewood-proper. As surrounding communities began to decline (early 20th century), many of their residents turned to Spicewood as the focus of local community life. A Baptist church was organized in 1908. In 1919, Spicewood school replaced nearby Rockvale school (no longer extant; only the graveyard remains) as the official local school. The population was approximately 100 during the mid-1920s and rose to 125 by 1933. Local businesses prospered when Farm to Market Road 93 (present-day State Highway 71) was built through the area during the 1940s. In 1949, the school in nearby Haynie Flat consolidated with Spicewood's school district. Three years later, Spicewood became part of the Marble Falls Independent School District. The population, which stood at around 100 in the 1970s and went up to 110 until 1990, had grown to an estimated 2,000 by 2000. It went up to 4,000 in 2010.

Spicewood has a post office, with the ZIP code 78669.

The local magneto-driven Spicewood Telephone exchange was taken over by GTE in the early 1970s and the area is now served by Verizon and cellular phone services.

The majority of local businesses are one mile south, at nearby "Hollingsworth Corner" (often misunderstood to be Spicewood proper) and include a general store serving gasoline, hardware, snack foods/beverages, Marine/Boat Service, a Used Car Lot, Real Estate, insurance, and Opie's BBQ. A favorite outdoor destination is nearby Krause Springs, formerly known as Tiger ("tigger") Springs, a spring-fed pond, swimming pool, and picnic/camping concession. The Spicewood area has four privately owned airports; one of them, the old "Austin Air Ranch" or "Windermere", FAA-identifier "88R", welcoming to public use, with fuel, hangar, and light-maintenance available, daytime-VFR use only. The other three airports, Flying X River Ranch (8TA3), Lakeside Beach (0XS6), and Fall Creek Air Ranch (52TS) (the last one not depicted on charts), are "Prior-Permission Required/At-Risk" only.

During September 2011, wildfires hit and significantly damaged the Spicewood area. Sixty-seven structures were lost or damaged across five subdivisions. The majority of the homes in those subdivisions were destroyed, with 22 homes destroyed in one subdivision alone. Seventeen state agencies and 150 firefighters worked to control the blaze. It affected a minimum of 10 square miles, or 6,400 acres.

In 2005, Cypress Valley Canopy Tours was established in the community.

Several studio albums by many different singers and bands have been recorded at Pedernales Country Club and Bee Creek Studios in Spicewood, including: 10, Half a Hundred Years, and Pasture Prime by western swing band Asleep at the Wheel; Angel Eyes and Partners by Willie Nelson; Spend a Night in the Box (The Reverend Horton Heat); Summerteeth (Wilco); Zooma (John Paul Jones); A River Ain't Too Much to Love (Smog); Seashores of Old Mexico (Merle Haggard and Willie Nelson); Music from Songwriter (Kris Kristofferson and Willie Nelson); The Unbroken Circle: The Musical Heritage of the Carter Family (The Carter Family); Wave on Wave (Pat Green); King of the Road: The Genius of Roger Miller (Roger Miller); This Will Destroy You by This Will Destroy You; Duets: Friends & Memories (Juice Newton); The song Cowboys Are Frequently, Secretly Fond of Each Other by Ned Sublette was also recorded at Pedernales and Bee Creek.

== Education ==
Public education in the community of Spicewood is provided by the Marble Falls Independent School District. Zoned campuses include Spicewood Elementary School (grades K-5; located in Spicewood), Marble Falls Middle School (grades 6-8), and Marble Falls High School (grades 9-12).

Some schools of the Lake Travis Independent School District have Spicewood street addresses.

=== Public libraries ===
There are multiple libraries that serve Spicewood. The primary options are the Spicewood Community Library, the west location of Lake Travis Community Library, and the Spicewood Springs branch of the Austin Public Library.

In 2007, residents came together and formed Spicewood Community Library. Located on Spur 191 in front of Spicewood Elementary School, the library is a volunteer effort with all materials being donated or acquired with donated funds. It became a branch in the Burnet County Library System in 2021.

== Media ==
Several films were recorded in Spicewood, including:

- Waiting for the Miracle to Come
- Ned Blessing: The True Story of My Life
- The Ballad of the Sad Cafe

== Notable people ==
- James Dickey, politician, lives in Spicewood with his wife and children.
- Jeff Kent, retired professional baseball player, owner of Lakecliff Country Club.
- Katy Kirby, musician, was raised in Spicewood.
- Lian Lunson, filmmaker, filmed Waiting for the Miracle to Come in Spicewood.
- Texe Marrs (1944-2019), writer and radio host
- James Oakley, politician
- Dave Pelz, golf coach, who conducts research and teaches at the Pelz Golf Institute.
- Kimmie Rhodes, singer-songwriter, recorded her first album at Willie Nelson's Pedernales Studios.
- Meredith Shaw, singer
- James Van Der Beek, television and film actor
- Ashley Weinhold, tennis player
