= Texas Park Road 4 =

State road in Burnet County, Texas, United States

PR 4
- PR 4 highlighted in red

Route information
- Maintained by TxDOT
- Length: 15.5 mi (24.9 km)
- Existed: June 22, 1937–present

Major junctions
- West end: SH 29
- East end: US 281

Location
- Country: United States
- State: Texas
- Counties: Burnet

Highway system
- Highways in Texas; Interstate; US; State; Former; Toll; Loops; Spurs; FM/RM; Park; Rec
← FM 4	→ RE 4
- Park Road 4 Historic District
- U.S. National Register of Historic Places
- U.S. Historic district
- U.S. National Natural Landmark
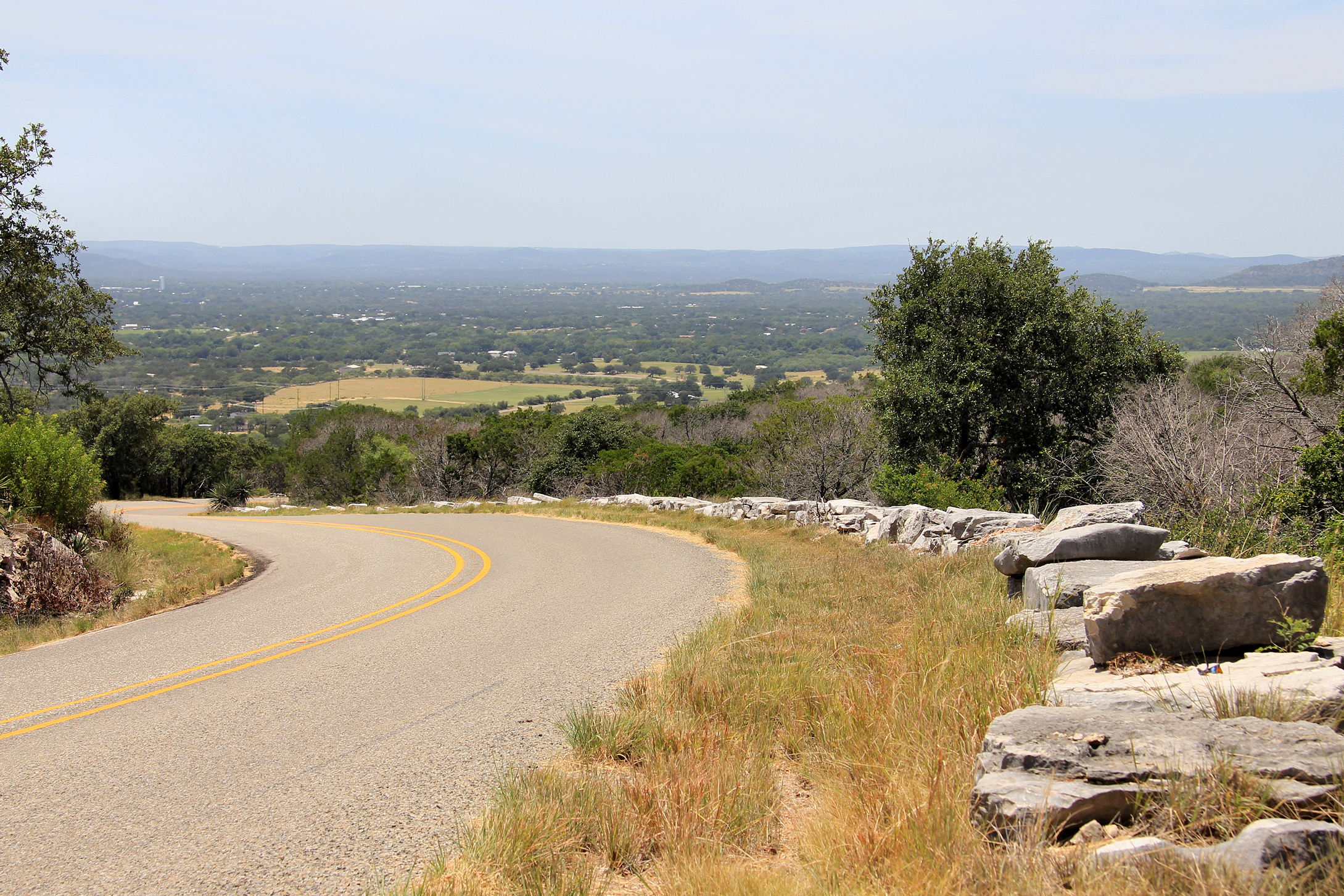
- Park Road 4 as it descends into Hoover's Valley.

- Location within Texas
- Location: PR 4 from US 281 to SH 29 & Longhorn Cavern State Park
- Coordinates: 30°42′3″N 98°22′51″W
- Area: 953 acres (386 ha)
- Built: 1934-1942
- Architect: Merrill E. DeLonge, et al.
- NRHP reference No.: 10001221

Significant dates
- Added to NRHP: February 7, 2011
- Designated NNL: 1971

Park Road 4 (PR 4) is a 15.5-mile-long (24.9 km) park road in western Burnet County, Texas that travels through and provides access to Longhorn Cavern State Park and Inks Lake State Park. The highway connects State Highway 29 (SH 29) to U.S. Route 281 (US 281). The highway was constructed between 1934 and 1942 by the Civilian Conservation Corps (CCC), Works Progress Administration (WPA) and Texas State Highway Department (TSHD).

== Route description ==
PR 4 begins at SH 29 near Buchanan Dam. The road then continues eastward through Inks Lake State Park. The road makes an ascent of 400 feet (120 m) from Hoover's Valley and then goes through Longhorn Caverns State Park before ending at US 281 south of Burnet.

== History ==
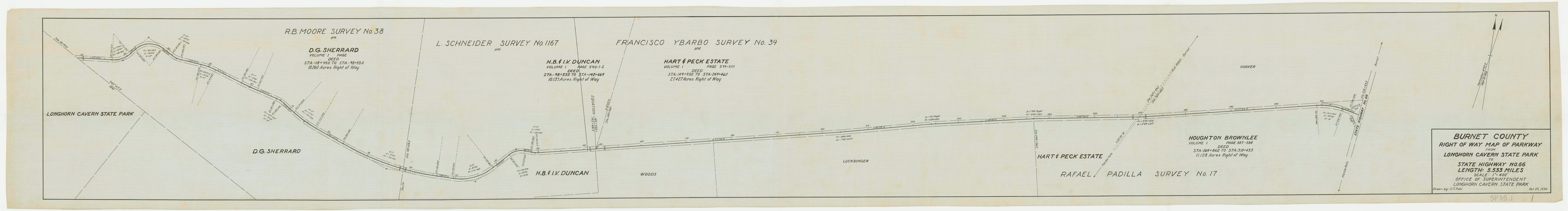
A Civilian Conservation Corps planning map of a parkway connecting the park to State Highway 66

The CCC constructed the first several miles in the mid-1930s to provide visitor access from US 281 to the newly renovated Longhorn Cavern State Park. Works Progress Administration workers extended the road west of the park headquarters in the early 1940s. The road connected with Ranch to Market Road 2342 (RM 2342) and was finally completed concurrently with the construction of Inks Lake State Park about 1942.

Between 1934 and 1942 the CCC and the TSHD built the eastern entrance portals, masonry bridges, retaining walls, two parking overlooks, culverts and guard walls. Large live oak and other trees were preserved by the CCC during road work, as indicated by historic plans and sketches. The CCC designed and installed additional plantings of native species at three locations along the roadway; the entrance portals, Longhorn Cavern, and Parking Overlook B.

All of PR 4 and Longhorn Cavern State Park were listed on the National Register of Historic Places on February 7, 2011, as the Park Road 4 Historic District. Longhorn Cavern was designated a National Natural Landmark in 1971. The CCC Museum building, located along the route and built to serve as the park administrative building at Longhorn Cavern, was designated a Recorded Texas Historic Landmark in 1989.

== Major intersections ==
The entire highway is in Burnet County.

Location	mi	km	Destinations	Notes
	0.0	0.0	SH 29	Western terminus
	7.2	11.6	RM 2342	
	15.5	24.9	US 281	Eastern terminus
1.000 mi = 1.609 km; 1.000 km = 0.621 mi

== See also ==
- List of Park Roads in Texas
- National Register of Historic Places listings in Burnet County, Texas
- Recorded Texas Historic Landmarks in Burnet County
