= Meadowlakes, Texas =

- City
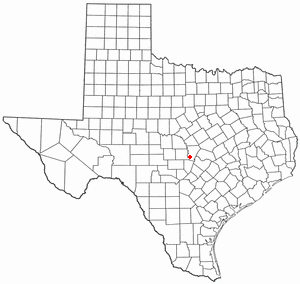
- Location of Meadowlakes, Texas

- Coordinates: 30°33′50″N 98°17′43″W
- Country: United States
- State: Texas
- County: Burnet

Area
  - Total: 0.78 sq mi (2.01 km^{2})
  - Land: 0.76 sq mi (1.97 km^{2})
  - Water: 0.015 sq mi (0.04 km^{2})
- Elevation: 817 ft (249 m)

Population (2020)
  - Total: 1,907
  - Density: 2,510/sq mi (968/km^{2})
- Time zone: UTC-6 (Central (CST))
  - Summer (DST): UTC-5 (CDT)
- ZIP code: 78654
- Area code: 830
- FIPS code: 48-47330
- GNIS feature ID: 2411066
- Website: meadowlakestexas.org

Meadowlakes is a city in Burnet County, Texas, United States. The population was 1,907 at the 2020 census.

== Geography ==
Meadowlakes is located in southern Burnet County on the north shore of the Colorado River. It is bordered to the northeast by Marble Falls and is 49 miles (79 km) northwest of downtown Austin.

According to the United States Census Bureau, Meadowlakes has a total area of 0.77 square miles (2.0 km^{2}), of which 0.02 square miles (0.04 km^{2}), or 2.06%, is water.

== Demographics ==
Historical population
Census	Pop.	Note	%±
1990	514		—
2000	1,293		151.6%
2010	1,777		37.4%
2020	1,907		7.3%
U.S. Decennial Census

=== 2020 census ===
As of the 2020 census, Meadowlakes had a population of 1,907 and 648 families residing in the city. The median age was 58.6 years, with 17.5% of residents under the age of 18 and 40.6% 65 or older. For every 100 females there were 82.7 males, and for every 100 females age 18 and over there were 79.5 males age 18 and over.

Racial composition as of the 2020 census
Race	Number	Percent
White	1,718	90.1%
Black or African American	6	0.3%
American Indian and Alaska Native	8	0.4%
Asian	13	0.7%
Native Hawaiian and Other Pacific Islander	0	0.0%
Some other race	26	1.4%
Two or more races	136	7.1%
Hispanic or Latino (of any race)	141	7.4%

There were 844 households in Meadowlakes, of which 22.0% had children under the age of 18 living in them. Of all households, 60.9% were married-couple households, 8.4% were households with a male householder and no spouse or partner present, and 28.3% were households with a female householder and no spouse or partner present. About 26.6% of all households were made up of individuals and 18.6% had someone living alone who was 65 years of age or older.

There were 909 housing units, of which 7.2% were vacant. The homeowner vacancy rate was 0.5% and the rental vacancy rate was 11.8%.

99.3% of residents lived in urban areas, while 0.7% lived in rural areas.

=== 2000 census ===
As of the census of 2000, there were 1,293 people, 573 households, and 472 families residing in the city. The population density was 1,673.2 inhabitants per square mile (646.0/km^{2}). There were 599 housing units at an average density of 775.1 per square mile (299.3/km^{2}). The racial makeup of the city was 97.83% White, 0.23% African American, 0.46% Native American, 0.77% Asian, 0.08% from other races, and 0.62% from two or more races. Hispanic or Latino of any race were 1.08% of the population.

There were 573 households, out of which 19.5% had children under the age of 18 living with them, 78.2% were married couples living together, 3.7% had a female householder with no husband present, and 17.5% were non-families. 16.1% of all households were made up of individuals, and 11.7% had someone living alone who was 65 years of age or older. The average household size was 2.26 and the average family size was 2.49.

In the city, the population was spread out, with 15.6% under the age of 18, 1.9% from 18 to 24, 14.7% from 25 to 44, 28.8% from 45 to 64, and 39.0% who were 65 years of age or older. The median age was 60 years. For every 100 females, there were 93.3 males. For every 100 females age 18 and over, there were 86.5 males.

The median income for a household in the city was $60,588, and the median income for a family was $67,206. Males had a median income of $51,912 versus $26,354 for females. The per capita income for the city was $32,779. About 2.5% of families and 2.5% of the population were below the poverty line, including 1.0% of those under age 18 and 2.7% of those age 65 or over.

== See also ==
- Marble Falls Independent School District
