= Marble Falls Independent School District =

School district in Texas, United States

Address
- 1800 Colt Circle Marble Falls, Texas, 78654; United States
- Coordinates: 30.5952°N 98.2736°W

District information
- Grades: PK–12
- Schools: 7
- NCES District ID: 4829010

Students and staff
- Students: 4,048 (2023–2024)
- Teachers: 303.98 (on an FTE basis)
- Student–teacher ratio: 13.32:1

Other information
- Website: www.mfisd.org

Marble Falls Independent School District ("MFISD") is a school district based in the city of Marble Falls, in Burnet County, Texas, USA which is located in the heart of the Highland Lakes region of the Texas Hill Country. The district encompasses 268 square miles (690 km^{2}) MFISD has a growing enrollment of approximately 4,000 students.

In 2017, the school district was rated "Met Standard" by the Texas Education Agency. In that year, all schools in the district were rated as "Met Standard" or as "Met Alternative Standard."

Within Burnet County it serves the communities of Marble Falls, Cottonwood Shores, Meadowlakes, Granite Shoals, Highland Haven, and the Burnet County portion of Horseshoe Bay. It also serves Smithwick and Spicewood. In addition to Burnet County, the district extends into Travis County.

== Schools ==
=== High schools ===
- Marble Falls High School (grades 9–12), classified as a 5A school by the University Interscholastic League.
- Falls Career High School is an alternative high school program in run in MFISD that allows high school-aged students to concurrently work and attend school. The current criteria for acceptance include the student's age, a minimum number of credits earned toward graduation, and being in circumstances where they are at-risk of or have dropped out of school, are unable to graduate with their cohort class, or a traditional high school cannot meet his/her needs.

Falls Career High School was piloted in August 2002 and there were 46 students in the first graduating class of 2003. Since its conception, the Falls Career program has been housed with the school district's offices in the Granite Building across the street from Marble Falls Elementary School. The successful passage of a November 2006 bond election included a provision to re-purpose the current Colt Elementary building into a new central office for the district and Falls Career/EPIC program once a new building for the elementary school is completed.

=== Middle school ===
- Marble Falls Middle School (grades 6-8)

=== Elementary schools ===
The district has four PK-5 elementary schools:

- Colt Elementary
- Marble Falls Elementary
- Highland Lakes Elementary (a 2004 National Blue Ribbon School)
- Spicewood Elementary.

== Notable alumni ==
- John Arthur Martinez
- Leonel Manzano
- David Morgan II

== See also ==
- Burnet County, Texas
- Marble Falls, Texas
