= David Morgan II =

American football player (born 1993)

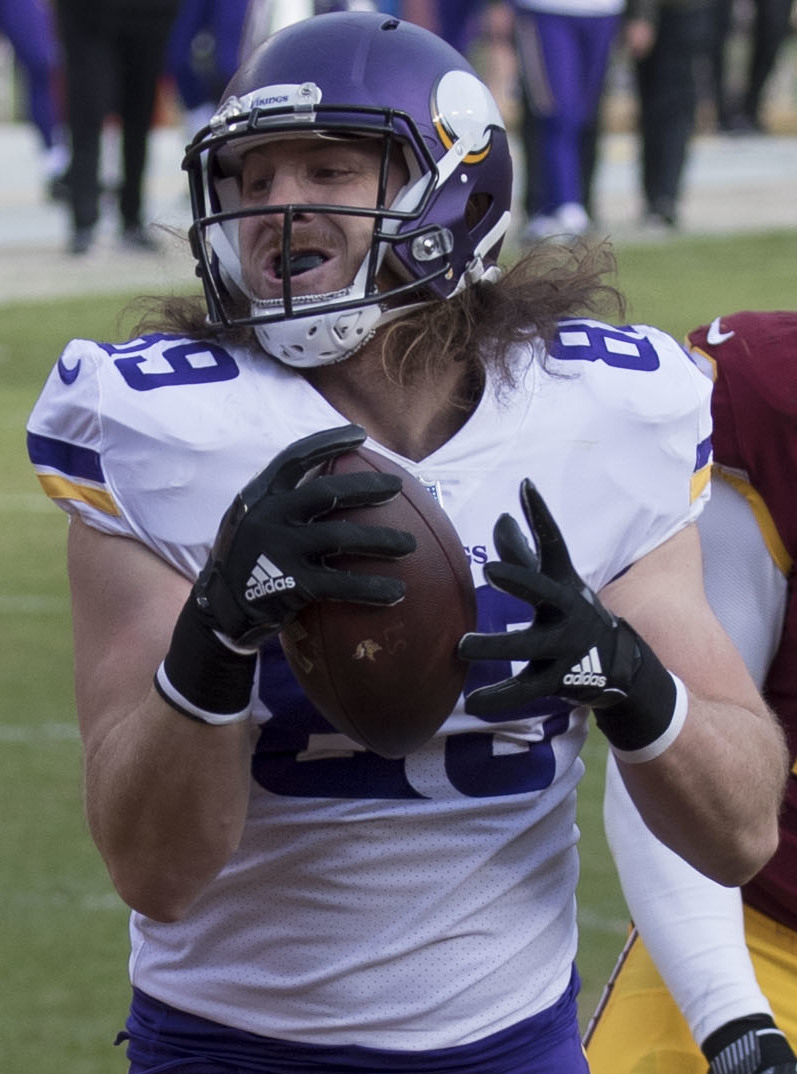
- Morgan in 2017

No. 89
- Position: Tight end

Personal information
- Born: May 19, 1993 (age 33); Marble Falls, Texas, U.S.
- Listed height: 6 ft 4 in (1.93 m)
- Listed weight: 265 lb (120 kg)

Career information
- High school: Marble Falls
- College: UTSA (2011–2015)
- NFL draft: 2016: 6th round, 188th overall pick

Career history
- Minnesota Vikings (2016–2019)

Awards and highlights
- Second-team All-American (2015); Second-team All-CUSA (2015)

Career NFL statistics
- Receptions: 16
- Receiving yards: 135
- Receiving touchdowns: 1
- Stats at Pro Football Reference

David Morgan II (born May 19, 1993) is an American former professional football player who was a tight end for the Minnesota Vikings of the National Football League (NFL). He played college football for the UTSA Roadrunners from 2011 to 2015 and became the school's first draftee when the Vikings selected him in the sixth round of the 2016 NFL draft.

== Early life ==
Born in Marble Falls, Texas, Morgan attended Marble Falls High School. A basketball and soccer player his entire life, Morgan started his football journey as a quarterback. From eighth grade on, he started playing as a wide receiver and helped lead his team to its first playoff appearance. He recorded 27 receptions for 478 yards (17.7 avg.) and eight touchdowns en route to first-team all-district honors as a junior. As a senior in 2010, he received second-team class 4A all-state, Austin American-Statesman first-team All-Centex and first-team All-District 25-4A honors after hauling in 68 passes for 1,251 yards (18.4 avg.) and 14 touchdowns. Aside from football, Morgan was a three-time academic all-district honoree and earned honorable mention academic all-state accolades as a senior and also participated in track & field at Marble.

== College career ==
At UTSA, Morgan served as the go-to target for his quarterback. Playing as a reserve in 2011, Morgan flashed talent by catching 13 passes for 214 yards and two touchdowns, with at least one reception in the opening nine contests. He posted a career-long catch-and-run of 63 yards in the season opener against Northeastern State. The following year, Morgan redshirted due to injury and managed just seven catches for 69 yards in his return in 2013. He earned honorable mention All-Conference USA (CUSA) recognition as a junior in 2014, nabbing 20 passes for 255 yards and a score while missing more time with another injury. As a senior in 2015, Morgan started all 12 games for the Roadrunners and was named a second-team All-American and second-team All-CUSA selection after finishing among the leading tight ends in the country with 45 receptions for 566 yards and setting the school's single-season record for touchdowns with five while also proving to be a great blocker (Pro Football Focus (PFF) graded him as the top run-blocking tight end in the nation). He twice managed nine receptions in a game during the season, against Louisiana Tech and Arizona, with his 109-yard effort against the Wildcats being UTSA's first 100-yard receiving game in three years. Morgan refused to take all the credit, saying in the press release: "This is an outstanding honor, one that would not have been possible without my coaches and teammates. To become the first All-American in UTSA history is something that is very humbling.”

== Professional career ==
Prior to the draft, NFL.com ranked Morgan tenth overall among tight ends. Morgan was invited to perform at the NFL Scouting Combine in Indianapolis, becoming the first player to attend this event in the history of UTSA. In the bench press testing, he ranked number one among tight ends with an official score of 29 repetitions. He also finished first in the 20-yard shuttle with a 4.19-second run, completed the 3-cone drill in 6.93 seconds to place third and took fifth with a time of 11.60 seconds in the 60-yard shuttle. At his pro day, Morgan improved in both his 40-yard dash (4.83 seconds) and vertical jump (32 inches) in front of over 20 NFL scouts.

External videos
- Morgan's NFL Combine workout
- Morgan gets drafted by Minnesota

Pre-draft measurables
Height	Weight	Arm length	Hand span	40-yard dash	10-yard split	20-yard split	20-yard shuttle	Three-cone drill	Vertical jump	Broad jump	Bench press
6 ft 4 in (1.93 m)	262 lb (119 kg)	33 5/8	10 1/2	4.83 s	1.68 s	2.82 s	4.19 s	6.93 s	32 in (0.81 m)	9 ft 7 in (2.92 m)	29 reps
All values from NFL Combine except 40 time and vertical from UTSA's Pro Day

After moving up eight slots in the sixth round of the 2016 NFL draft, the Minnesota Vikings acquired the 188th overall pick and selected Morgan, making him the first ever player from UTSA to be drafted.

As a rookie in 2016, Morgan played 11 games and had one reception for four receiving yards.

On November 12, 2017, Morgan caught his first career touchdown against the Washington Redskins.

On August 31, 2019, Morgan was placed on the reserve/physically unable to perform list to start the season after undergoing knee surgery in the offseason. Later, in February 2020, it was revealed that Morgan season suffered a knee dislocation in a 2018 game against the Detroit Lions.

Morgan was released by the Vikings on March 13, 2020, with a failed physical designation.

== Career statistics ==
=== NFL ===
Season	Team	Games		Receiving							
Season	Team	GP	GS	Rec	Yds	Avg	Lng	TD	1st	+20	+40
Regular season
2016	Minnesota Vikings	11	0	1	4	4.0	4	0	0	0	0
2017	Minnesota Vikings	15	6	10	95	9.5	23	1	5	1	0
	Total	26	6	11	99	9.0	23	1	5	1	0

=== College ===
Year	Team	Rec	Yards	Avg	Long	Rec TDs
2011	UTSA	13	214	16.5	63	2
2013	UTSA	7	69	9.9	19	0
2014	UTSA	20	255	12.8	25	1
2015	UTSA	45	566	12.6	32	5
College totals		85	1,104	13.0	63	8

== Personal life ==
Morgan has a tight bond with his family, particularly his parents and his fiancé, Langlie Cooley. Morgan frequently consults with them for important decisions, notably various aspects of the process of transitioning from college football to the NFL. Outside of football, Morgan enjoys the outdoors and frequently goes hunting and fishing. Morgan has an eclectic taste in music and has a penchant for James Taylor, born from exposure from his parents as a kid.
