= Granite Shoals, Texas =

- City
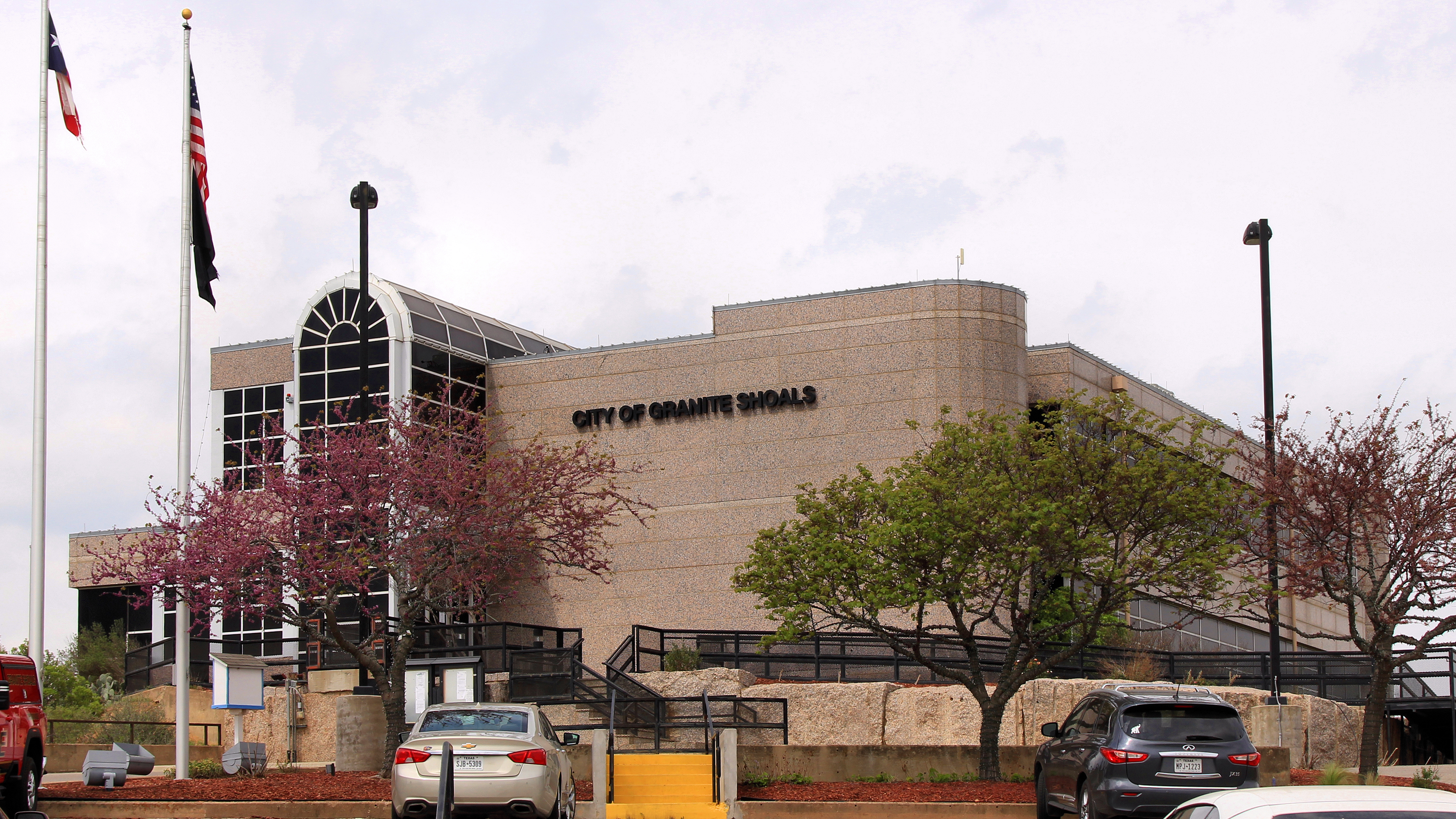
- Granite Shoals City Hall
- Nickname: City of Parks
- Motto: Your Gateway to Lake LBJ
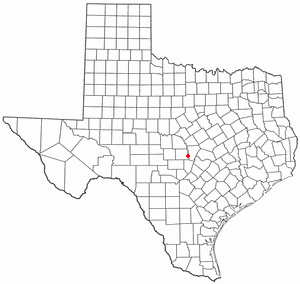
- Location of Granite Shoals, Texas

- Coordinates: 30°35′20″N 98°22′54″W
- Country: United States
- State: Texas
- County: Burnet
- Incorporated: 1966

Government
  - Type: Home rule municipality

Area
  - Total: 6.91 sq mi (17.90 km^{2})
  - Land: 5.77 sq mi (14.95 km^{2})
  - Water: 1.14 sq mi (2.95 km^{2})
- Elevation: 853 ft (260 m)

Population (2020)
  - Total: 5,129
  - Density: 881.2/sq mi (340.23/km^{2})
- Time zone: UTC-6 (Central (CST))
  - Summer (DST): UTC-5 (CDT)
- ZIP code: 78654
- Area code: 830
- FIPS code: 48-30584
- GNIS feature ID: 2410644
- Website: www.graniteshoals.org

Granite Shoals is a city in Burnet County, Texas, United States with a 2020 census population of 5,129.

== Geography ==
Granite Shoals is located in southwestern Burnet County 7 miles (11 km) west of Marble Falls and 56 miles (90 km) northwest of downtown Austin, on a bend on the east shore of Lake Lyndon B. Johnson.

According to the United States Census Bureau, the city has a total area of 5.7 square miles (14.7 km^{2}), of which 4.5 square miles (11.7 km^{2}) is land and 1.2 square miles (3.0 km^{2}), or 20.25%, is water.

== Demographics ==
Historical population
| Census | Pop. | Note | %± |
|---|---|---|---|
| 1970 | 342 | | — |
| 1980 | 634 | | 85.4% |
| 1990 | 1,378 | | 117.4% |
| 2000 | 2,040 | | 48.0% |
| 2010 | 4,910 | | 140.7% |
| 2020 | 5,129 | | 4.5% |
U.S. Decennial Census

=== 2020 census ===
As of the 2020 census, Granite Shoals had a population of 5,129 people, 1,789 households, and 1,333 families residing in the city. The median age was 37.4 years. 25.9% of residents were under the age of 18 and 15.6% of residents were 65 years of age or older. For every 100 females there were 104.2 males, and for every 100 females age 18 and over there were 101.9 males age 18 and over.

There were 1,789 households in Granite Shoals, of which 37.2% had children under the age of 18 living in them. Of all households, 52.2% were married-couple households, 17.4% were households with a male householder and no spouse or partner present, and 22.9% were households with a female householder and no spouse or partner present. About 20.5% of all households were made up of individuals and 10.6% had someone living alone who was 65 years of age or older.

There were 2,423 housing units, of which 26.2% were vacant. The homeowner vacancy rate was 2.2% and the rental vacancy rate was 6.3%.

0.0% of residents lived in urban areas, while 100.0% lived in rural areas.

Racial composition as of the 2020 census
| Race | Number | Percent |
|---|---|---|
| White | 2,804 | 54.7% |
| Black or African American | 48 | 0.9% |
| American Indian and Alaska Native | 48 | 0.9% |
| Asian | 21 | 0.4% |
| Native Hawaiian and Other Pacific Islander | 0 | 0.0% |
| Some other race | 1,268 | 24.7% |
| Two or more races | 940 | 18.3% |
| Hispanic or Latino (of any race) | 2,648 | 51.6% |

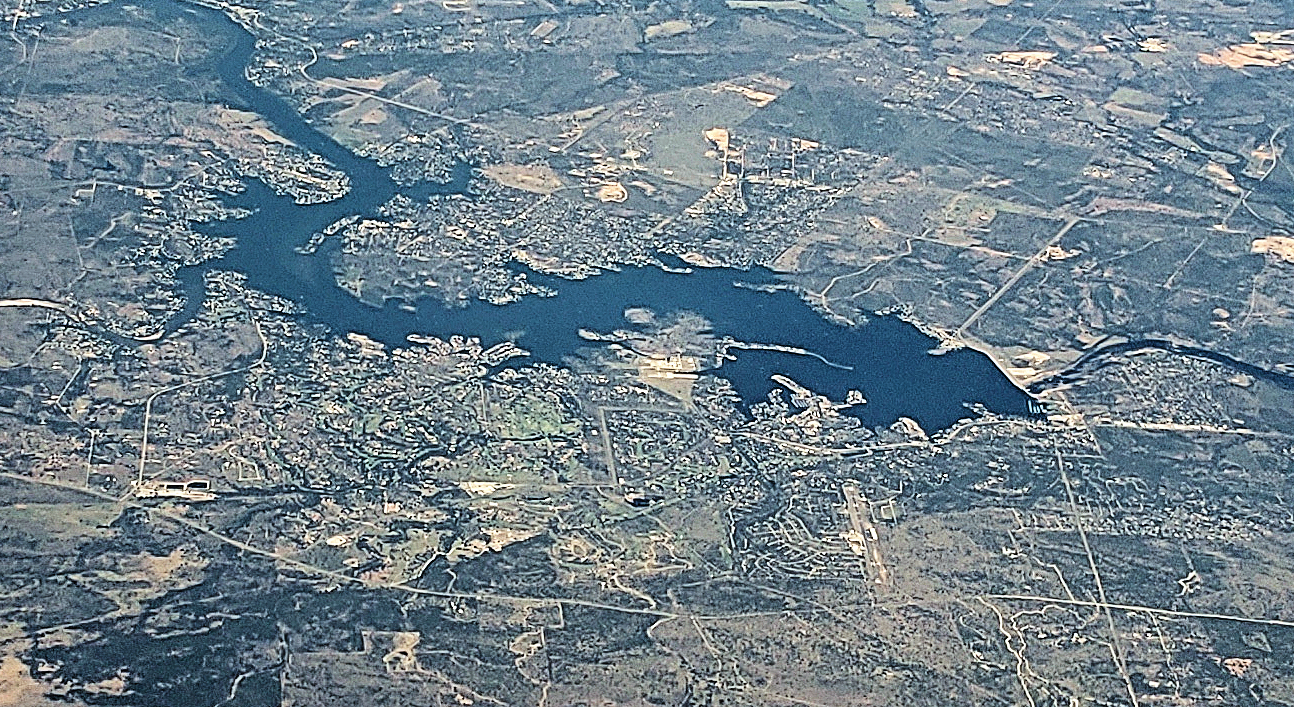
Granite Shoals on the far shore of the lake.

=== 2000 census ===
As of the 2000 census, there were 2,040 people, 825 households, and 593 families residing in the city. The population density was 828 inhabitants per square mile (320/km^{2}). There were 1,224 housing units at an average density of 497 per square mile (192/km^{2}). The racial makeup of the city was 86.57% White, 1.13% African American, 0.74% Native American, 0.05% Asian, 0.05% Pacific Islander, 10.44% from other races, and 1.03% from two or more races. Hispanic or Latino of any race were 21.18% of the population.

There were 825 households, out of which 27.6% had children under the age of 18 living with them, 59.3% were married couples living together, 8.1% had a female householder with no husband present, and 28.1% were non-families. 22.2% of all households were made up of individuals, and 10.9% had someone living alone who was 65 years of age or older. The average household size was 2.47 and the average family size was 2.87.

In the city, the population was spread out, with 23.9% under the age of 18, 7.0% from 18 to 24, 25.8% from 25 to 44, 23.8% from 45 to 64, and 19.5% who were 65 years of age or older. The median age was 40 years. For every 100 females, there were 100.8 males. For every 100 females age 18 and over, there were 96.3 males.

The median income for a household in the city was $31,283, and the median income for a family was $34,053. Males had a median income of $24,948 versus $20,000 for females. The per capita income for the city was $17,434. About 10.6% of families and 14.4% of the population were below the poverty line, including 20.6% of those under age 18 and 7.1% of those age 65 or over.

== History ==
Granite Shoals was incorporated as a city by a vote of area residents in 1966. The original city comprised various sections of the Sherwood Shores subdivision, which was at the time the largest platted subdivision in the state of Texas. The Sherwood Shores subdivisions were created from the Phillips, Naumann and Ebeling ranches in 1962. In November 2005, residents voted to adopt a home rule charter to govern the city. In 2006, the city hired its first city manager, John W. Gayle.

The major industry in Granite Shoals is granite mining, and the city is popular with lake enthusiasts with its 18 city parks, 14 of which are located on Lake Lyndon B. Johnson. The city's municipal complex is home to Quarry Park, which has 2 regulation covered tennis courts, a baseball field, batting cages, and a covered multi-sports complex with basketball, soccer, and pickleball facilities. In 2011, the city received a grant to fund the Leonel Manzano Hike, Bike and Run Trails at its municipal complex, which has 2-mile and 1/2-mile trails. Leonel Manzano grew up in Granite Shoals. The city is undergoing strong growth with the opening of several new stores.

== Schools ==
Students in Granite Shoals attend schools in the Marble Falls Independent School District, with elementary students attending Highland Lakes Elementary School in Granite Shoals, and middle and high school students travelling six miles to neighboring Marble Falls.
