= Cypress Valley Canopy Tours =

Aerial resort in the Texas Hill Country

Coordinates: 30°25′14″N 98°06′20″W

- Type: Private
- Industry: canopy research, ecotourism
- Founded: 2005 in Spicewood, Texas, United States
- Headquarters: Spicewood, Texas
- Owner: Amy Beilharz, David Beilharz

Cypress Valley Canopy Tours is an aerial resort located along the Pedernales River in the Texas Hill Country. Founded in 2005, the company offers canopy tours, canopy walks, zip-lining and overnight treehouse accommodations for guests.

== Overview ==
Cypress Valley Canopy Tours was founded by Amy and David Beilharz and began operation in 2005 after they bought the property in 1999 and decided they needed to share it, making it the first canopy ziplining tour in the continental United States. The Beilharzes came up with the idea of ziplining after discovering it in Costa Rica; they had previously tried other vocations such as buffalo ranching. It is situated approximately 30 miles east of Austin, Texas on 88 acres of cypress forest purchased by the Beilharz family in 1998.

Guided tours focus on biology, ecology, and area history, and consist of six zip lines, three sky bridges, and a rappel. Many of the cypress trees in the area exceed 100 feet in height. The property also features a picnic area, a small lake and a swimming pool.

Describing "The Nest," one of the treehouses on the property, the Huffington Post said, "If the Swiss Family Robinson ever thought about upgrading their home to include more luxurious finishes, this would be it." Another treehouse, "The Lofthaven," has been called, "a romantic bird's-eye suite for two." Other treehouses on the property include Juniper and Willow. The first treehouse was built in 2006, but was damaged during the 2011 Texas wildfires.

Cypress Valley Canopy Tours was recognized as one of the 20 best places in Texas to get your adrenaline pumping by the Houston Chronicle, which described it as, "an ideal destination for risk-takers who prefer not to lounge around."

As of 2017, Amy and David Beilharz are building another treehouse resort in the California redwoods.
