= Highland Haven, Texas =

- City
- Coordinates: 30°36′27″N 98°23′42″W
- Country: United States
- State: Texas
- County: Burnet

Area
  - Total: 0.54 sq mi (1.41 km^{2})
  - Land: 0.44 sq mi (1.14 km^{2})
  - Water: 0.10 sq mi (0.27 km^{2})
- Elevation: 846 ft (258 m)

Population (2020)
  - Total: 418
  - Density: 950/sq mi (367/km^{2})
- Time zone: UTC-6 (Central (CST))
  - Summer (DST): UTC-5 (CDT)
- ZIP code: 78654
- Area code: 830
- FIPS code: 48-33794
- GNIS feature ID: 2410761
- Website: highlandhaventx.com

Highland Haven is a city in Burnet County, Texas, United States. The population was 418 at the 2020 census.

== Geography ==
Highland Haven is located in southwestern Burnet County along the eastern shore of Lake Lyndon B. Johnson. It is about 18 miles (29 km) southwest of Burnet, the county seat, and 57 miles (92 km) northwest of downtown Austin.

According to the United States Census Bureau, the city has a total area of 0.54 square miles (1.4 km^{2}), of which 0.42 square miles (1.1 km^{2}) is land and 0.12 square miles (0.3 km^{2}), or 19.60%, is water.

=== Climate ===
Climate data for Highland Haven, Texas
Month	Jan	Feb	Mar	Apr	May	Jun	Jul	Aug	Sep	Oct	Nov	Dec	Year
Average precipitation inches	1.73	1.81	2.67	2.50	4.19	3.10	2.55	2.10	3.50	3.53	2.58	2.13	32.39
Average precipitation mm	44	46	68	64	106	79	65	53	89	90	66	54	824
Source: NOAA

== Demographics ==
Historical population
Census	Pop.	Note	%±
2000	450		—
2010	431		−4.2%
2020	418		−3.0%
U.S. Decennial Census; 2020 Census

=== 2020 census ===
As of the 2020 census, Highland Haven had a population of 418. The median age was 66.9 years, with 7.2% of residents under the age of 18 and 54.5% 65 years of age or older. For every 100 females there were 101.0 males, and for every 100 females age 18 and over there were 101.0 males age 18 and over.

99.3% of residents lived in urban areas, while 0.7% lived in rural areas.

There were 217 households in Highland Haven, of which 13.8% had children under the age of 18 living in them. Of all households, 58.5% were married-couple households, 15.2% were households with a male householder and no spouse or partner present, and 23.5% were households with a female householder and no spouse or partner present. About 29.1% of all households were made up of individuals and 23.5% had someone living alone who was 65 years of age or older.

There were 316 housing units, of which 31.3% were vacant. The homeowner vacancy rate was 1.9% and the rental vacancy rate was 0.0%.

Racial composition as of the 2020 census
Race	Number	Percent
White	383	91.6%
Black or African American	0	0.0%
American Indian and Alaska Native	2	0.5%
Asian	0	0.0%
Native Hawaiian and Other Pacific Islander	0	0.0%
Some other race	8	1.9%
Two or more races	25	6.0%
Hispanic or Latino (of any race)	25	6.0%

=== 2000 census ===
As of the 2000 census of 2000, there were 450 people, 226 households, and 169 families residing in the city. The population density was 1,061.0 inhabitants per square mile (409.7/km^{2}). There were 272 housing units at an average density of 641.3 per square mile (247.6/km^{2}). The racial makeup of the city was 98.00% White, 0.89% Native American, 0.22% Asian, 0.44% from other races, and 0.44% from two or more races. Hispanic or Latino of any race were 4.44% of the population.

There were 226 households, out of which 8.8% had children under the age of 18 living with them, 70.8% were married couples living together, 3.1% had a female householder with no husband present, and 24.8% were non-families. 21.7% of all households were made up of individuals, and 17.7% had someone living alone who was 65 years of age or older. The average household size was 1.99 and the average family size was 2.25.

In the city, the population was spread out, with 8.9% under the age of 18, 0.4% from 18 to 24, 11.3% from 25 to 44, 31.1% from 45 to 64, and 48.2% who were 65 years of age or older. The median age was 64 years. For every 100 females, there were 94.8 males. For every 100 females age 18 and over, there were 87.2 males.

The median income for a household in the city was $54,375, and the median income for a family was $59,792. Males had a median income of $32,125 versus $23,125 for females. The per capita income for the city was $30,528. About 1.2% of families and 0.9% of the population were below the poverty line, including none of those under age 18 and 1.9% of those age 65 or over.

== See also ==
- Marble Falls Independent School District
