= Krause Springs =

Swimming site in the Texas Hill Country

Coordinates: 30.4805°N 98.1459°W

- Krause Spring Site
- U.S. National Register of Historic Places
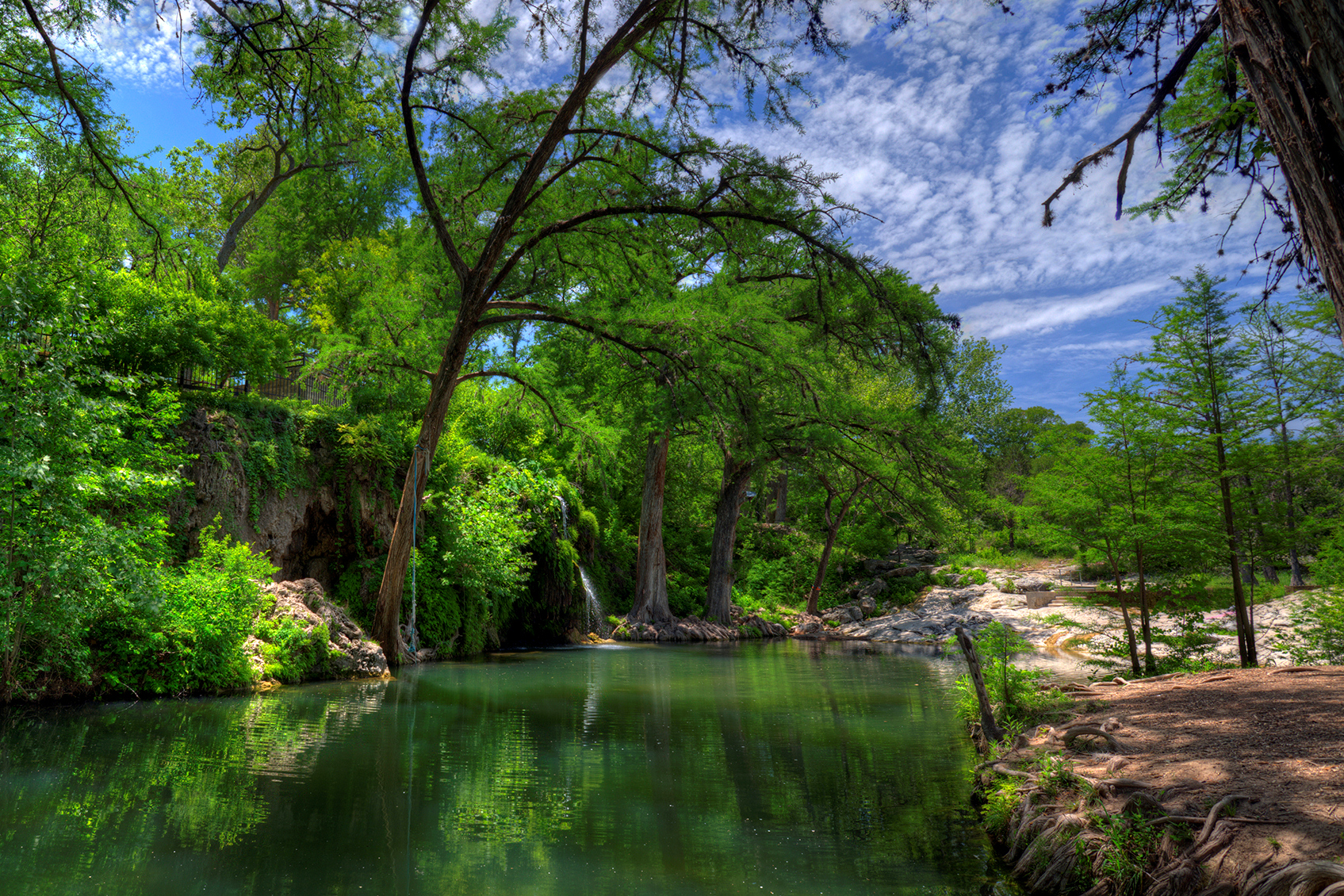

- Location within Texas
- Nearest city: Spicewood, Texas
- Area: 35 acres (14 ha)
- NRHP reference No.: 78002901
- Added to NRHP: November 15, 1978

Krause Springs (ˈkroʊzi ˈsprɪŋz) is a camping and swimming site located in the Hill Country of Texas. It is located in Spicewood, Texas, approximately 30 miles (48 km) northwest of Austin. The 115-acre (0.47 km^{2}) property has 32 springs, and several feed the man-made pool and the natural pool which flow into Lake Travis. Two springs feed the 70' by 20' swimming pool at a rate of 70 gallons per minute at a temperature of about 70 degrees.

Krause Springs is listed on the National Register of Historic Places and has been privately owned by the Krause family for over 50 years.
