= Longhorn Cavern State Park =

State park in Texas, United States

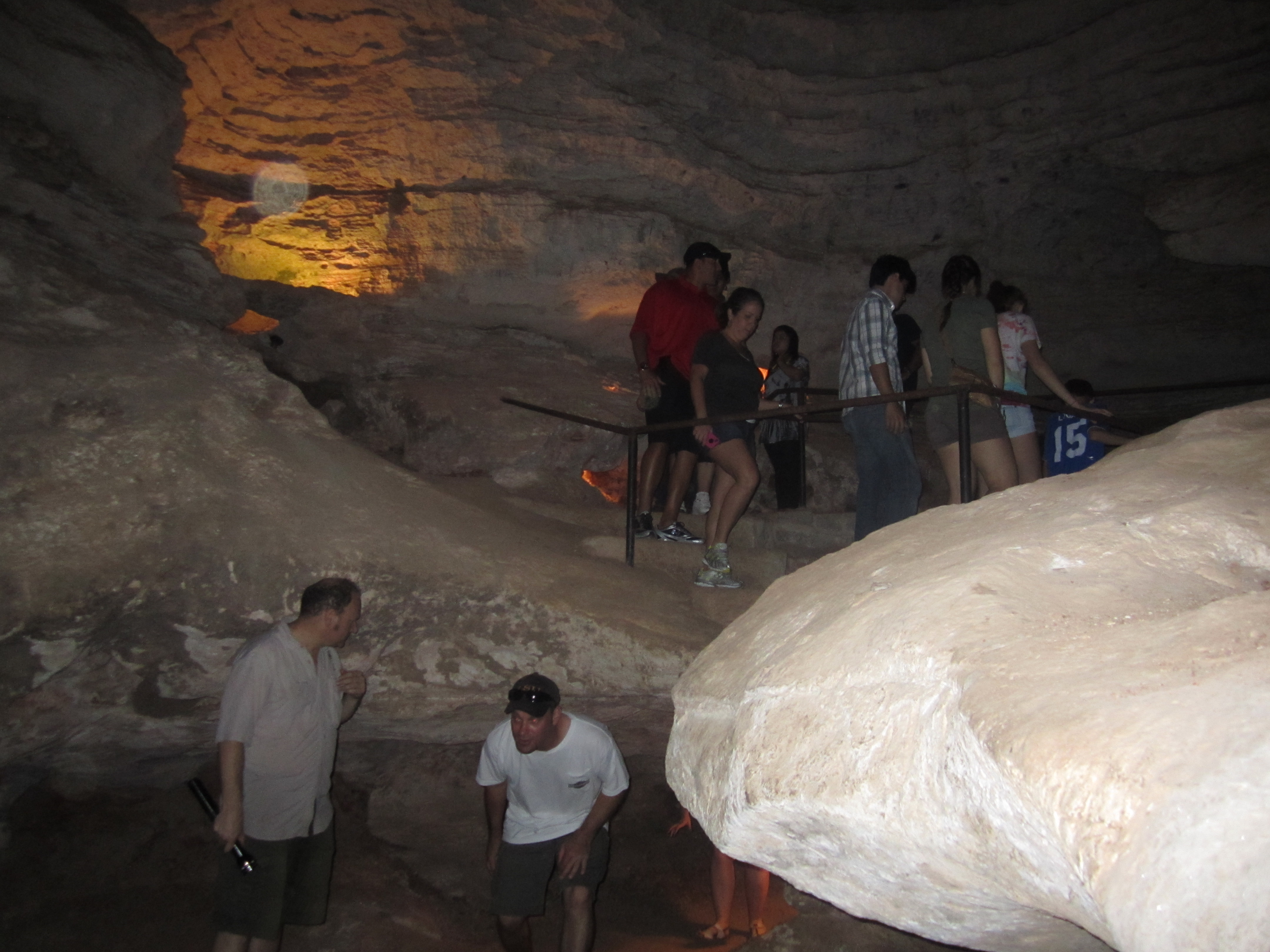
- Visitors at Longhorn Cavern climb down steps built by the Civilian Conservation Corps.
- Location: Burnet County, Texas
- Nearest city: Kingsland in Llano County, Texas
- Coordinates: 30°41′5″N 98°21′3″W
- Area: 645.62 acres (261 ha)
- Established: 1976
- Visitors: 86,959 (in 2025)
- Governing body: Texas Parks and Wildlife Department
- Website: Official site

U.S. National Natural Landmark
- Designated: 1971

U.S. Historic district
- Designated: February 7, 2011
- Part of: Park Road 4 Historic District
- Reference no.: 10001221

Longhorn Cavern State Park is a 645.62 acres (261 ha) state park located in Burnet County, Texas, United States. The Texas Parks and Wildlife Department is administrator of the facility. The land for Longhorn Cavern State Park was acquired between 1932 and 1937 from private owners. It was dedicated as a state park in 1932 and in 1938 was opened to the public. In 1971, the cavern was dedicated as a National Natural Landmark. The park's administration building was listed as a Recorded Texas Historic Landmark in 1989.

== Human history ==
The park is named for Longhorn Cavern, a limestone cave formed by the cutting action of an underground river that receded thousands of years ago. Before the cave became a tourist attraction, it was used over the years by Native Americans, Confederate soldiers and outlaws, including outlaw Sam Bass. Sam Bass's story is considered folklore and not verified fact.

In the late 1920s and early 30s the cavern was used by area residents as a nightclub with shows being broadcast via radio back to San Antonio. Performing musicians would entertain through the night. The popular spot was known as Sherrard's Cave before it was dedicated as Longhorn Cavern State Park in November 1933. From 1934 to 1942, Company 854 of the Civilian Conservation Corps constructed Texas Park Road 4, residences, pavilions and an observation tower in the National Park Service Rustic architectural style. They also explored the cavern and made it accessible by removing some 2.5 tons of silt, debris, and guano and building stairs and walkways both into and inside the cavern.

In 2006, Steven Kurtz, curator of Longhorn Cavern State Park, re-introduced chamber music to the cave with the creation of the Simple Sounds concert series. Not until February 14, 2008, did dancers return to the cave floor when local Burnet County band Redneck Jedi performed. On April 4, 2008, Redneck Jedi returned to the cave and recorded their fifth album, Unplugged and Underground, the first such recording inside the cave.

In 2008, Fantastic Fest hosted an after party for the premiere of City of Ember. In 2012, the cavern tour area received a new lighting system.

In 2019, the cavern was used as a filming location for the YouTube interactive series A Heist with Markiplier.

== Nature ==
The caverns were once home to a colony of Mexican free-tailed bats, but now they are only inhabited by tricolored bats.

There is over a mile of nature trails in the park which are home to a wide variety of birds, including the endangered golden-cheeked warbler.

== Gallery ==
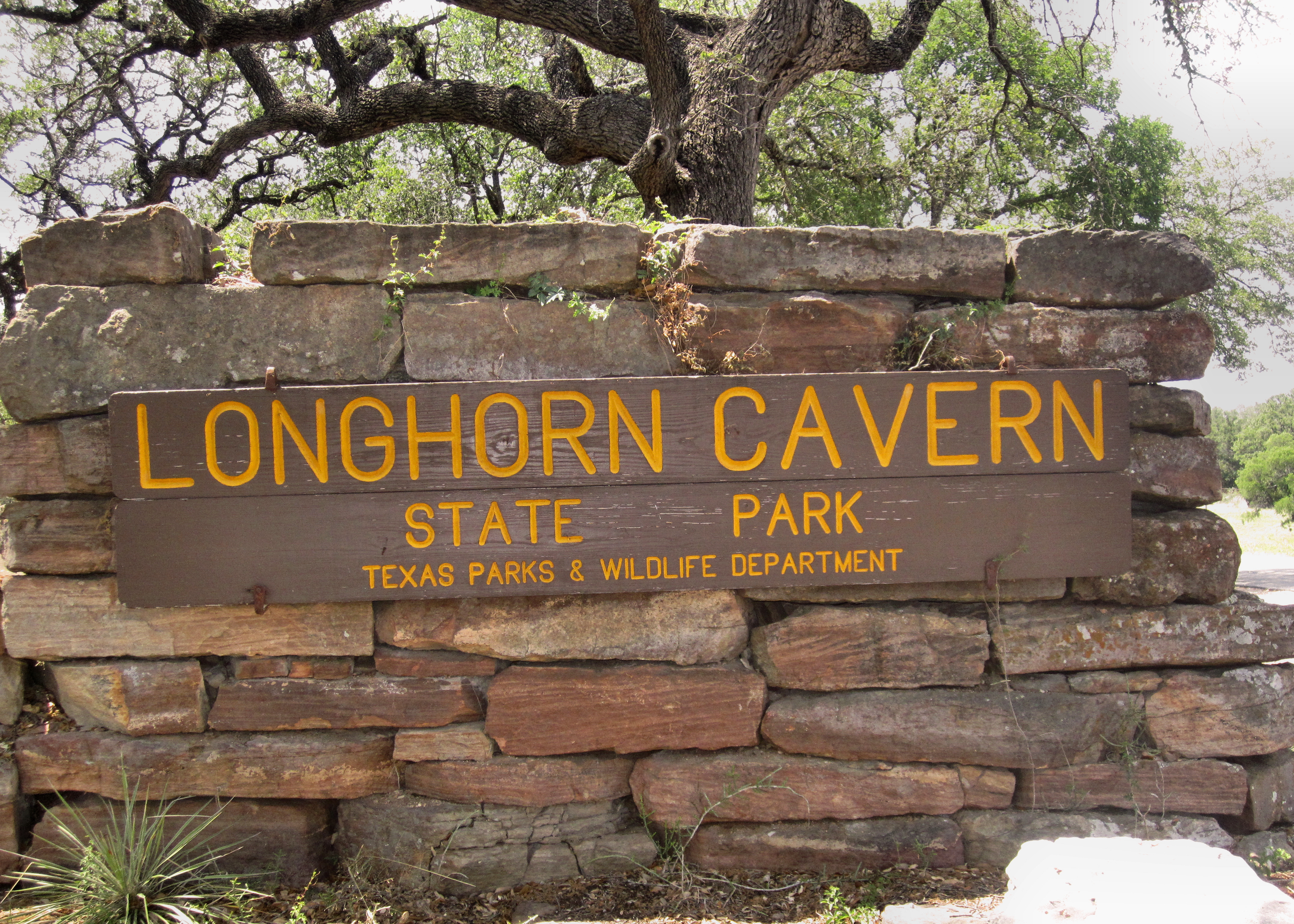
Longhorn Cavern entrance portal

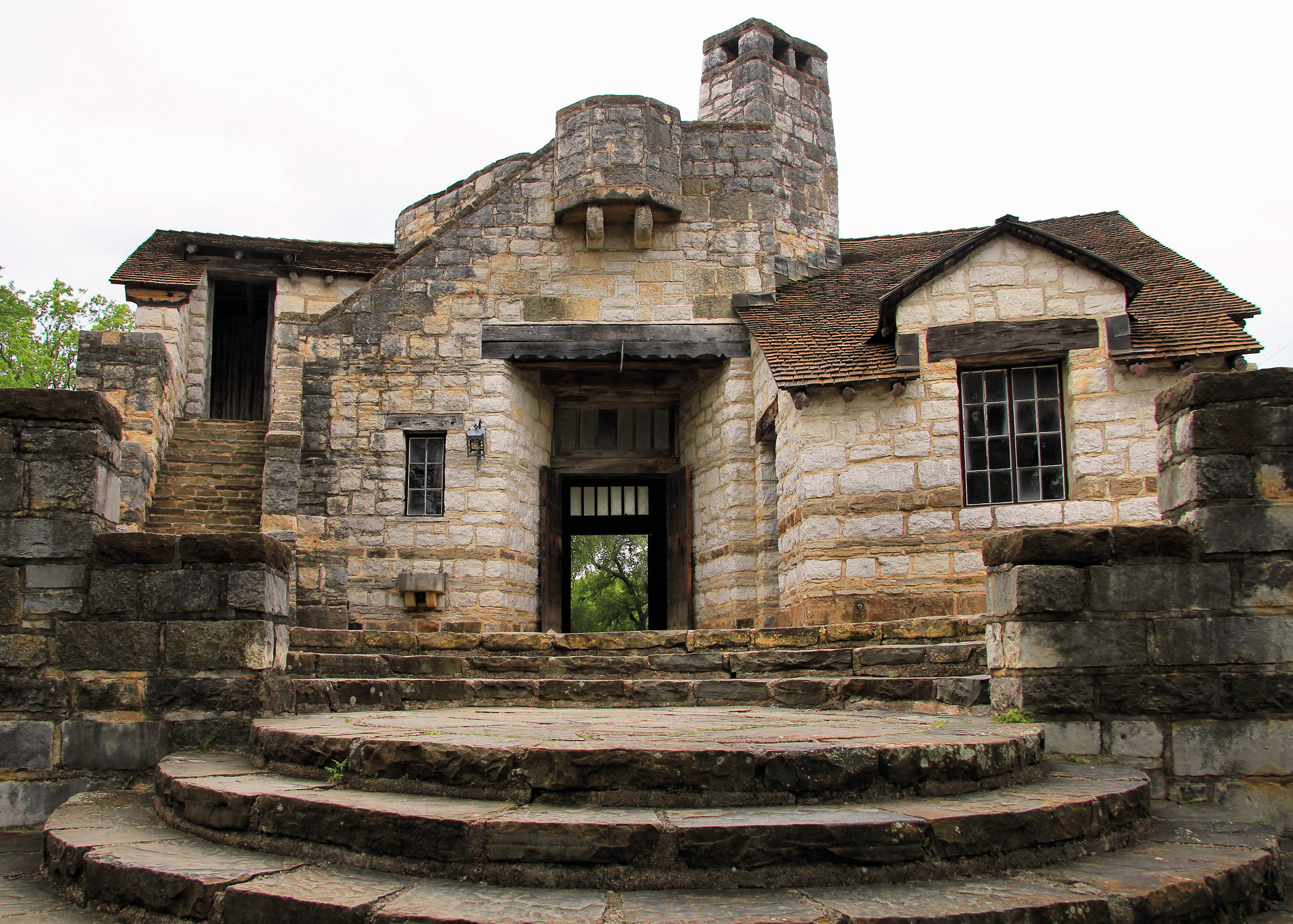
The former administration building built by the Civilian Conservation Corps.

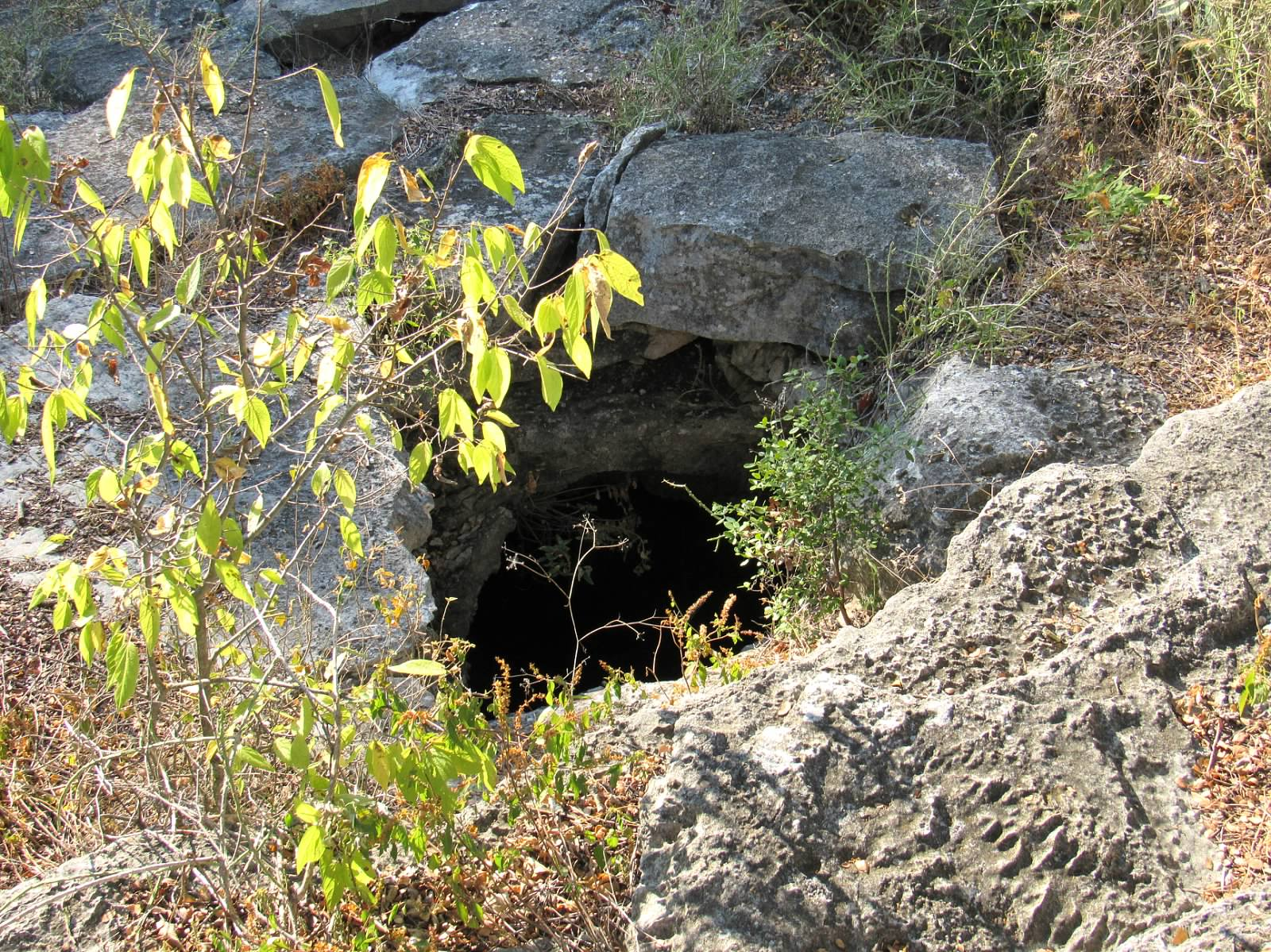
Longhorn Caverns natural entrance

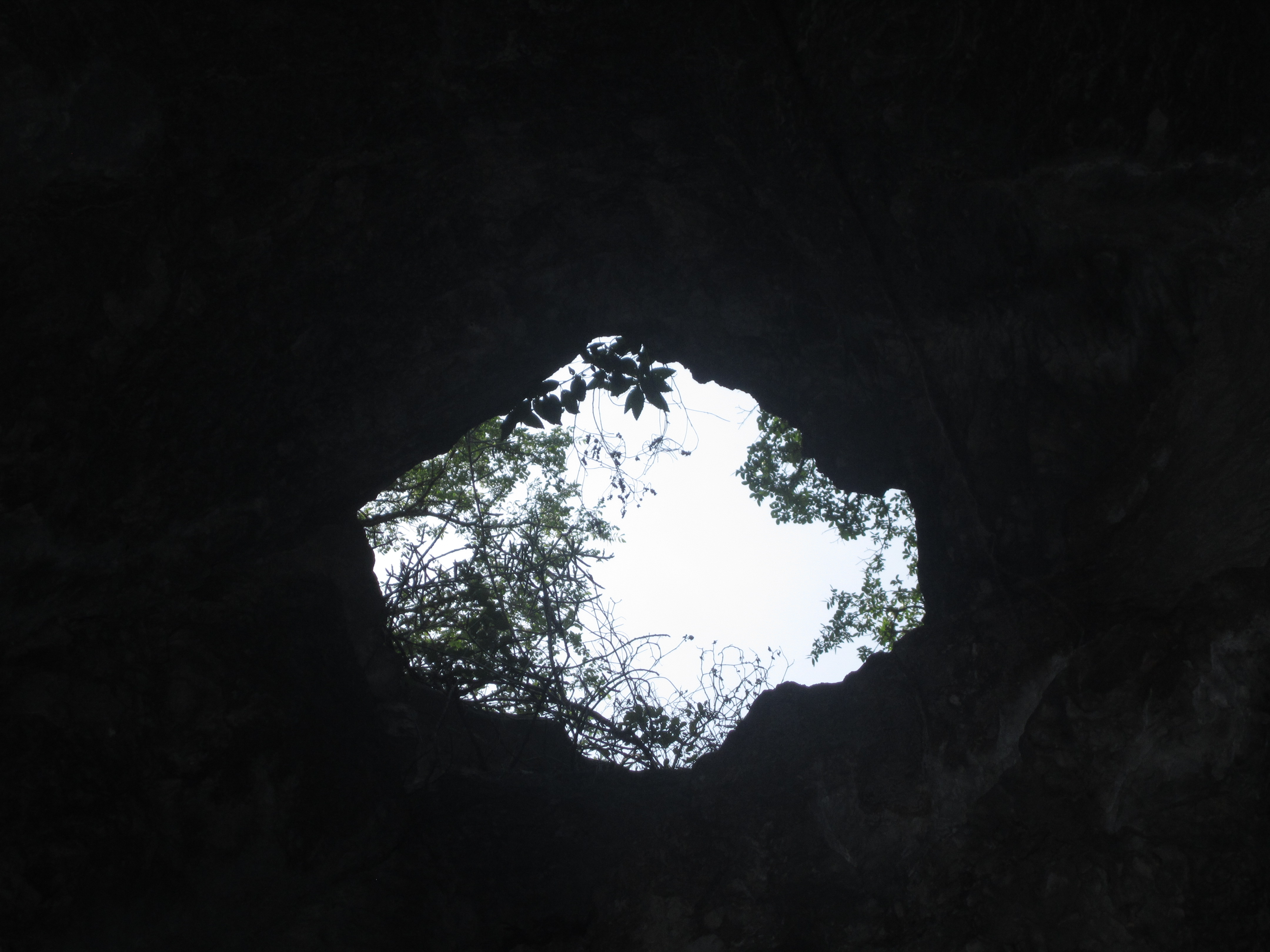
One of the natural openings at Longhorn Cavern

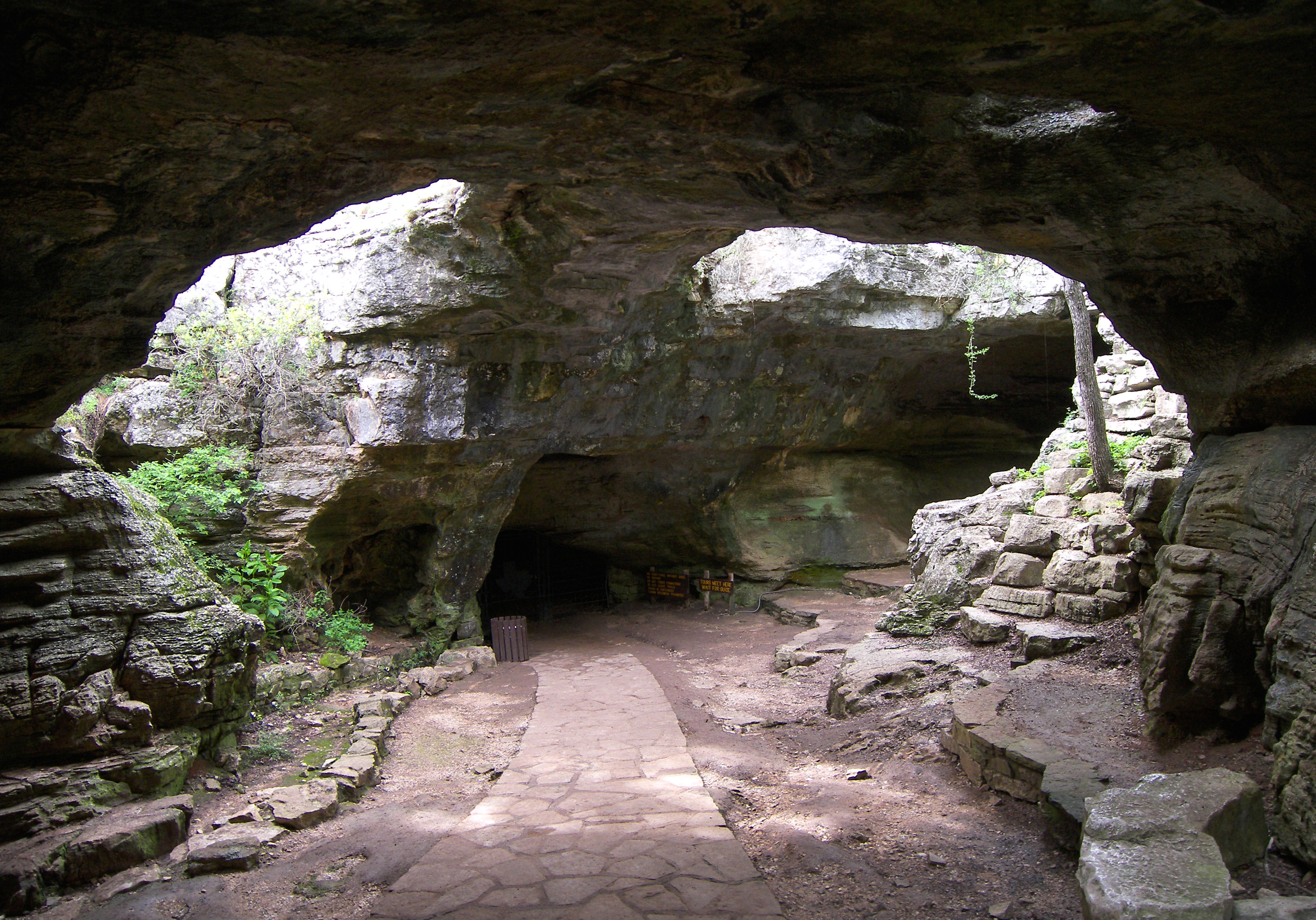
Longhorn Cavern constructed entrance

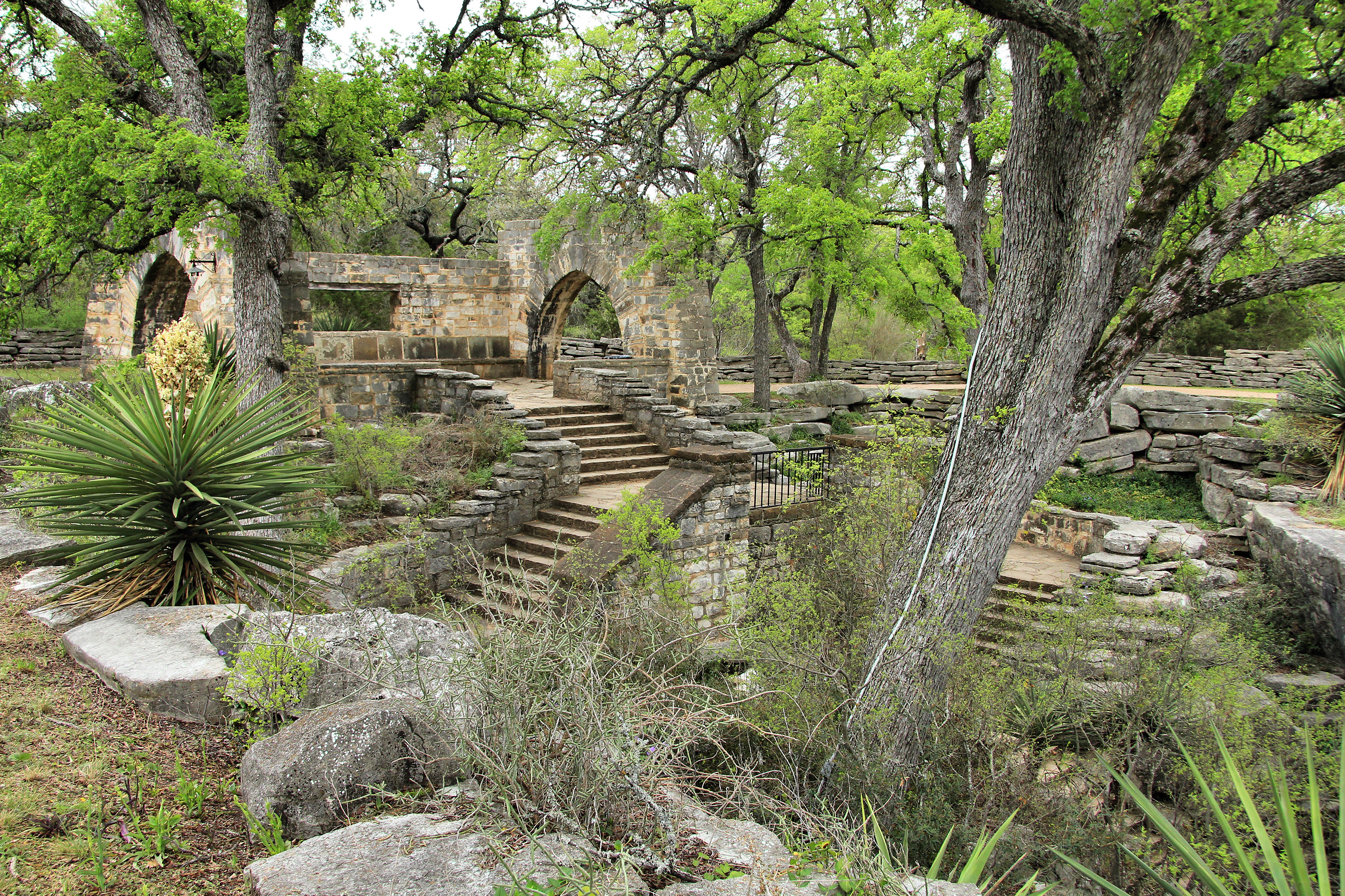
The grand staircase leading to the cavern entrance was built by the Civilian Conservation Corps.

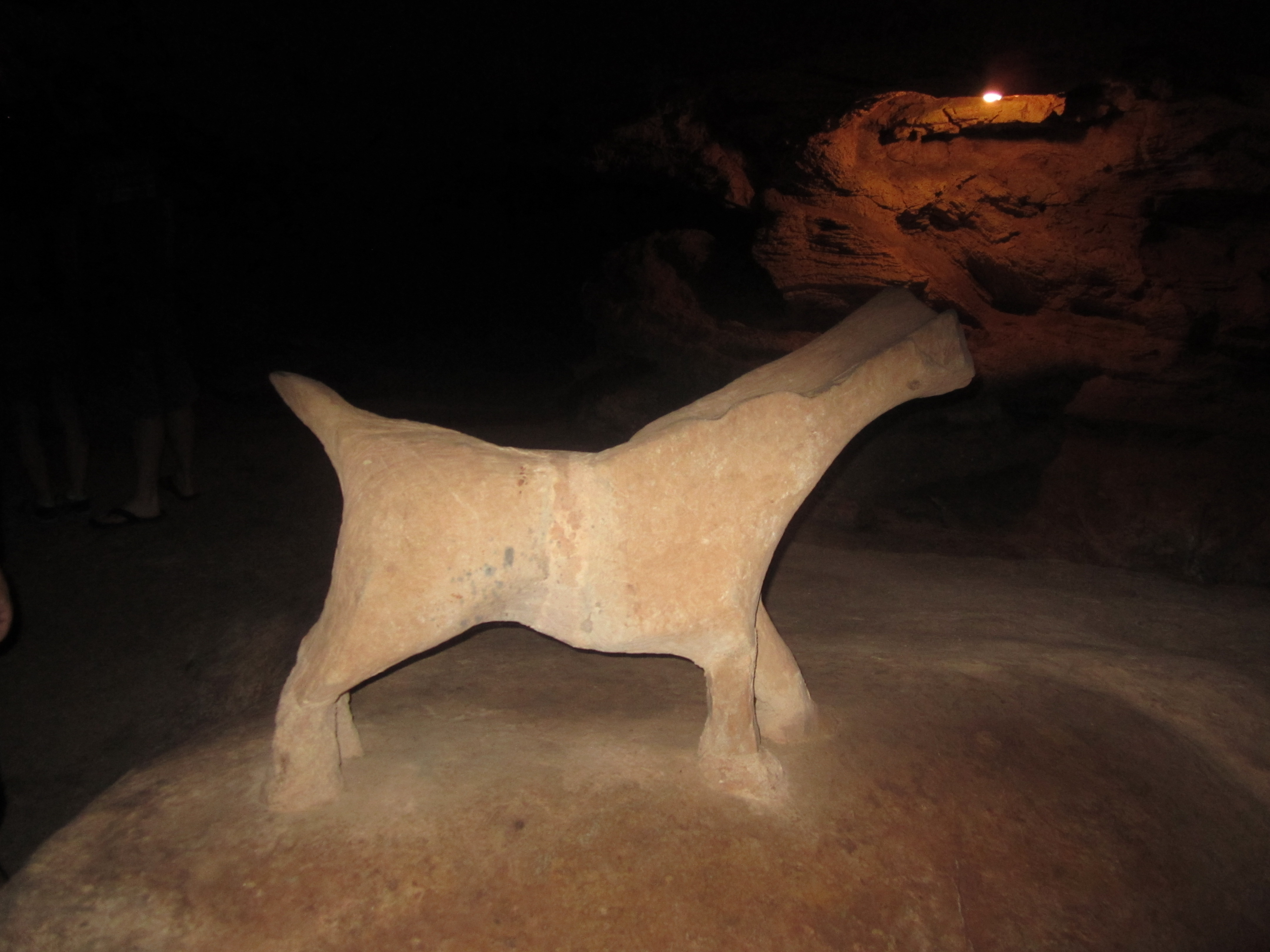
"Queen's Watchdog" formation at Longhorn Cavern

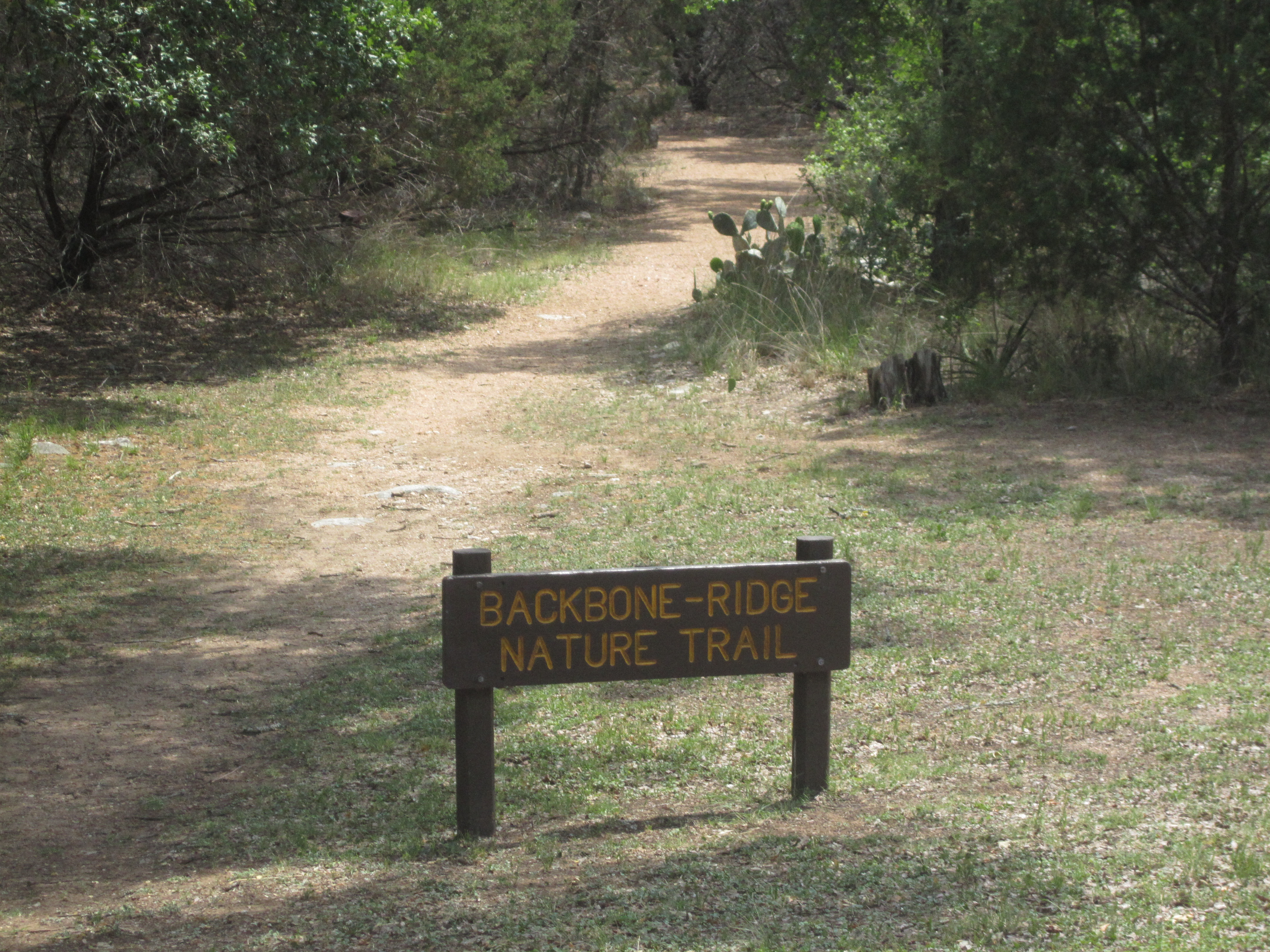
Backbone-Ridge Nature Trail at Longhorn Cavern

== See also ==
- List of Texas state parks
