= Leonel Manzano =

Mexican-American middle-distance track and field athlete

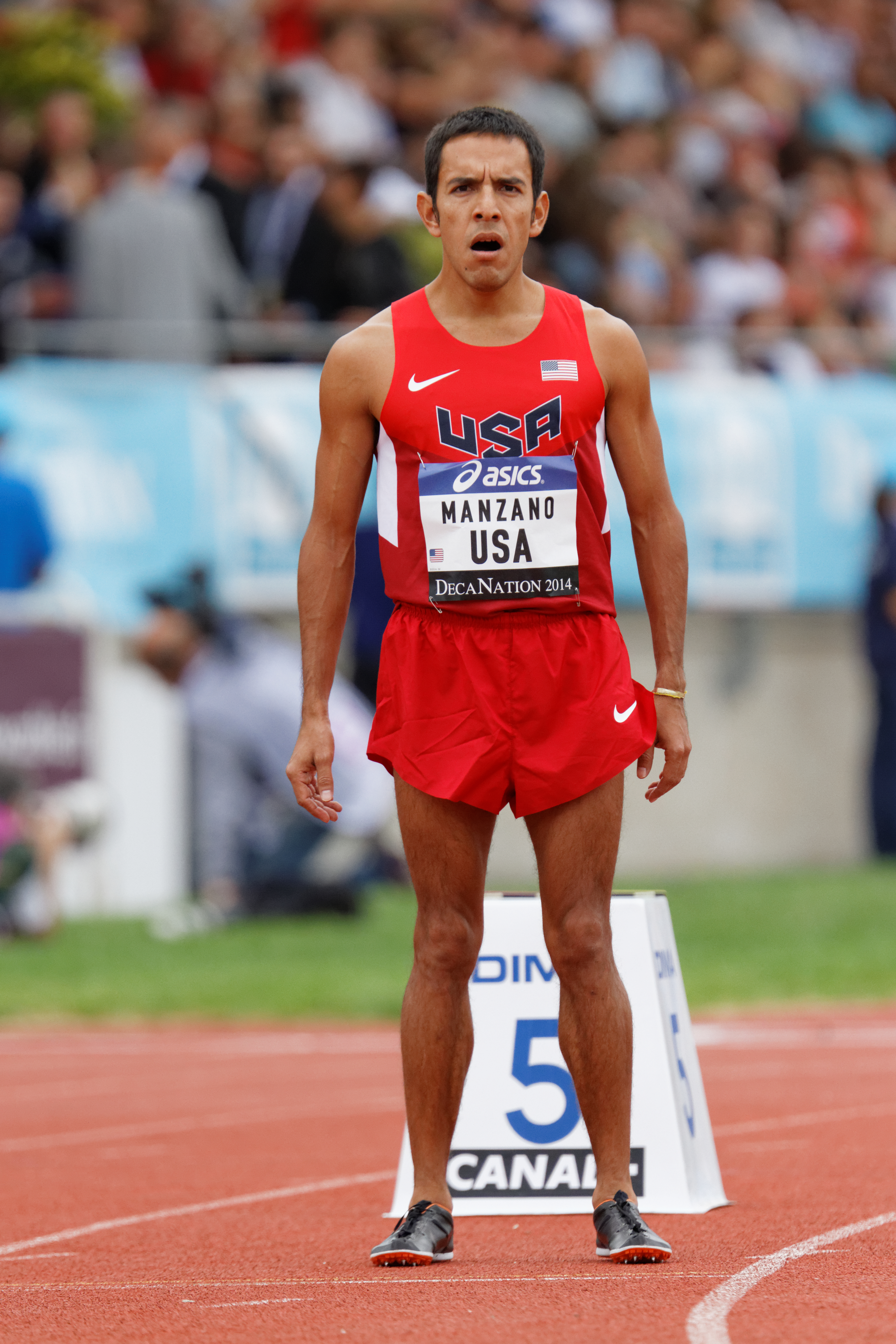
- Manzano at the 2014 DécaNation

Personal information
- Nationality: Mexican and American
- Born: September 12, 1984 (age 42) Dolores Hidalgo, Guanajuato, Mexico
- Height: 5 ft 5 in (1.65 m)
- Weight: 125 lb (57 kg)

Sport
- Sport: Track
- College team: University of Texas Austin

Achievements and titles
- Personal bests: 800 meters: 1:44.56; 1500 meters: 3:30.98; Mile: 3:50.64
Medal record
Men's athletics
Representing United States
Olympic Games
Silver medal – second place	2012 London	1500 m
Continental Cup
Bronze medal – third place	2010 Split	1500 m
USA Outdoor Championships
Gold medal – first place	2012 Eugene	1500 m
Gold medal – first place	2014 Sacramento	1500 m
Silver medal – second place	2007 Indianapolis	1500 m
Silver medal – second place	2008 Eugene	1500 m
Silver medal – second place	2009 Eugene	1500 m
Silver medal – second place	2010 Des Moines	1500 m
Silver medal – second place	2013 Des Moines	1500 m
Bronze medal – third place	2006 Indianapolis	1500 m
Bronze medal – third place	2011 Eugene	1500 m
Bronze medal – third place	2015 Eugene	1500 m

Leonel "Leo" Manzano (born September 12, 1984) is a Mexican-American former middle-distance track and field athlete specializing in the 1500 m and mile. He was a silver medalist at the 2012 Summer Olympics. Manzano is known for finishing his races with a strong finishing kick.

== Running career ==
=== Early life and high school ===
Born in Dolores Hidalgo, Guanajuato, Mexico, Manzano moved with family to Texas at the age of four. He was raised in Granite Shoals, Texas, and excelled at Marble Falls High School, where he won a total of nine Texas 4A state championships in track and cross country. Manzano recorded prep bests of 1:50.48 (800 m), 4:06.29 (1600 m), and 9:07.18 (3200 m).

=== Collegiate ===
During a recruiting trip to the University of Texas, Austin, Manzano went on a training run with several runners on the track and field team. It is reported that they ran 8 miles. After coming back from the run, Manzano was quoted as saying that the 8-mile run was the longest run he had ever completed. As a prep, Manzano possessed incredible talent and upside, having never trained in a higher-mileage system. Manzano's early talent did not go unnoticed, earning him a spot on the track and field team for the University of Texas, where he won five NCAA National Championship titles, earned All American nine times and holds four school records, including the indoor mile (3:58.78), 1,500 meter (3:35.29), and indoor and outdoor distance-medley relay. His senior year culminated in the Men's Track Athlete of the Year award from the US Track and Field and Cross Country Coaches Association (USTFCCCA). He is the first Longhorn to ever make the U.S. Olympic team in the 1,500 meter and remains the most decorated athlete ever in the history of Track and Field at the University of Texas.

=== Post-collegiate ===
Three weeks after winning his final collegiate race, Manzano qualified for the 2008 Beijing Olympics with a runner-up finish at the 2008 United States Olympic Trials. At the 2008 Beijing Olympics, he placed twelfth in his semi-final.

2009
Manzano had a breakthrough season at the international level in 2009, qualifying for the World Championships 1500 m event final. His success that season would also include victories at Reebok Grand Prix in New York and British Grand Prix, as well as second-place finishes at the 2009 IAAF World Athletics Final, London Grand Prix and Rieti Meeting.

2010
In 2010, Leo competed at IAAF Diamond League meets, while achieving personal bests in the mile (3:50.64), 800 m (1:44.56), and 1500 m (3:32.37) in the span of three weeks. He was elected to compete for the Americas at the 2010 IAAF Continental Cup and took the 1500 m bronze medal.

2011
A series of injuries in 2011 resulted in less success at the international level that year. However, he was able to put together a strong late season performance to win the Emsley Carr Mile against a strong field.

2012
In 2012, Manzano returned to form and won the 1500 m titles at the USA Indoor Track and Field Championships and 2012 United States Olympic Trials, while qualifying for the 2012 Summer Olympics. Throughout his career, Manzano has represented the United States on 6 world championship teams, including 2 Olympic Teams—2008 and 2012.

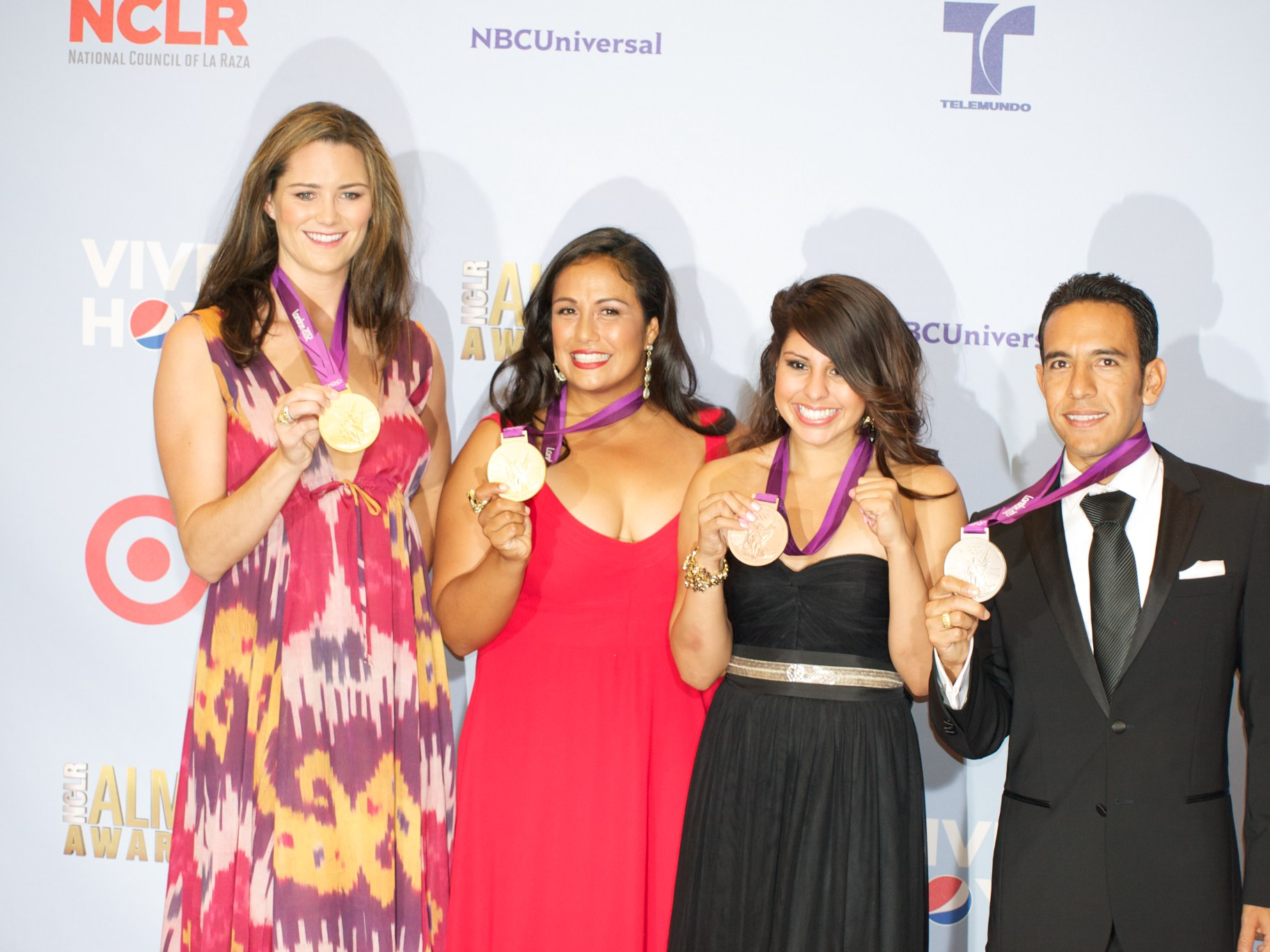
Manzano (far right) along with Jessica Steffens, Marlen Esparza and Brenda Villa at the 2012 ALMA Awards

In the 1500 m final at the 2012 Summer Olympics, Leo Manzano unleashed his signature kick to claim the silver medal. Manzano became the first American to medal in the 1500 m since Jim Ryun won silver in Mexico City 1968, breaking a 44-year drought for the U.S. men's middle distance running.

2014

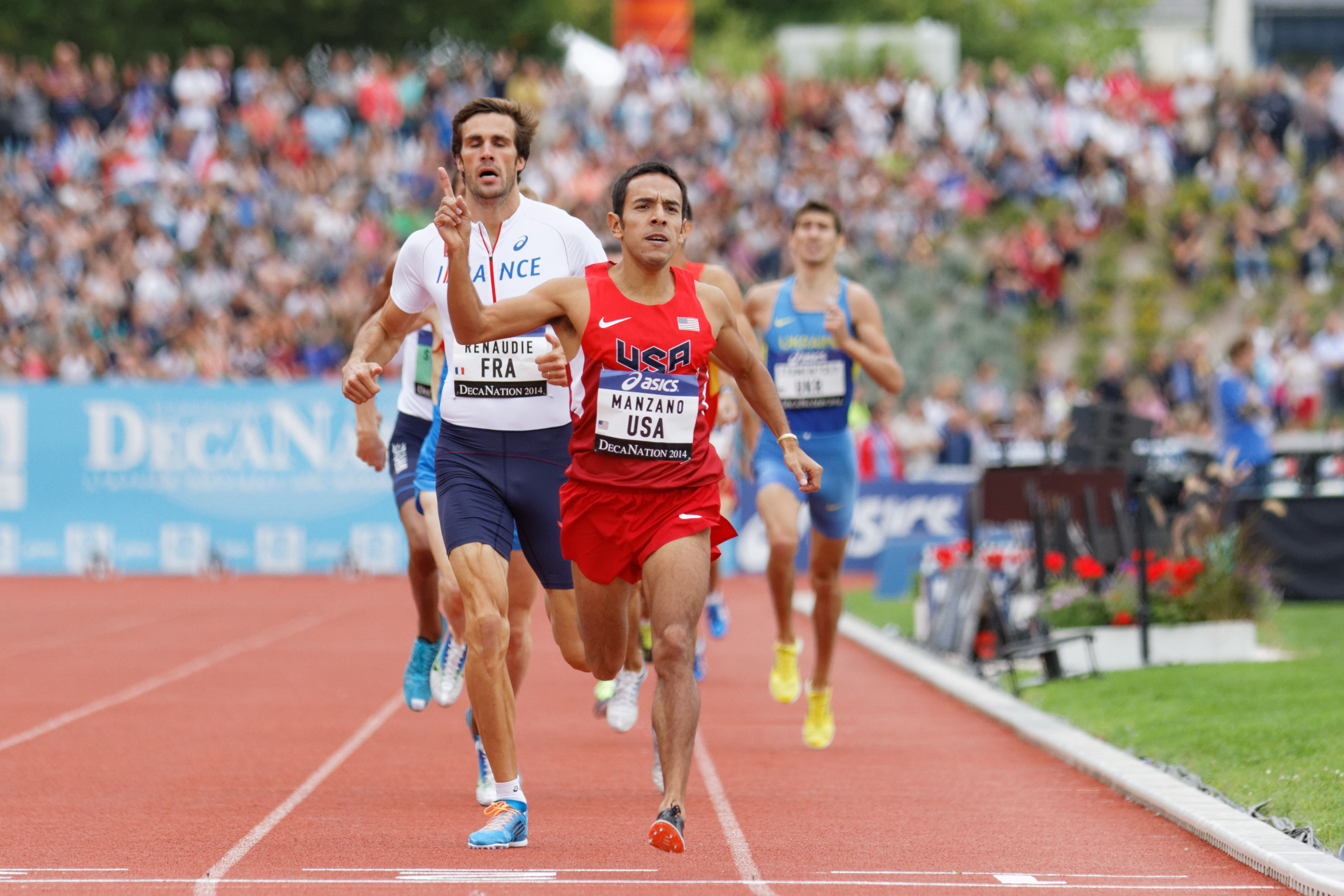
Manzano running at the 2014 DécaNation

Leonel Manzano won another 1500 meter title in 3:38.63 at the 2014 USA Outdoor Track and Field Championships in Sacramento, California. On 18 July, Manzano ran a personal best of 3:30.98 to take 8th place at the Diamond League Herculis Monaco. Manzano's time in the incredibly deep field was the fastest clocking of 8th place in any meet in history.

2015
Leonel Manzano placed 3rd at 1500 meters at the 2015 USA Outdoor Track and Field Championships and 10th in 2015 World Championships in Athletics – Men's 1500 metres

2016
Leonel Manzano placed 4th at 1500 meters at the 2016 United States Olympic Trials (track and field). Manzano is a Coca-Cola spokesperson.

2019
On July 28, 2019, Leo announced his retirement citing a calf injury from February and a desire to spend more time with family ‘’’2026’’’ Now work as a physical education coach, track coach, and assistant athletic director as Valor South Austin.
