= Marble Falls High School =

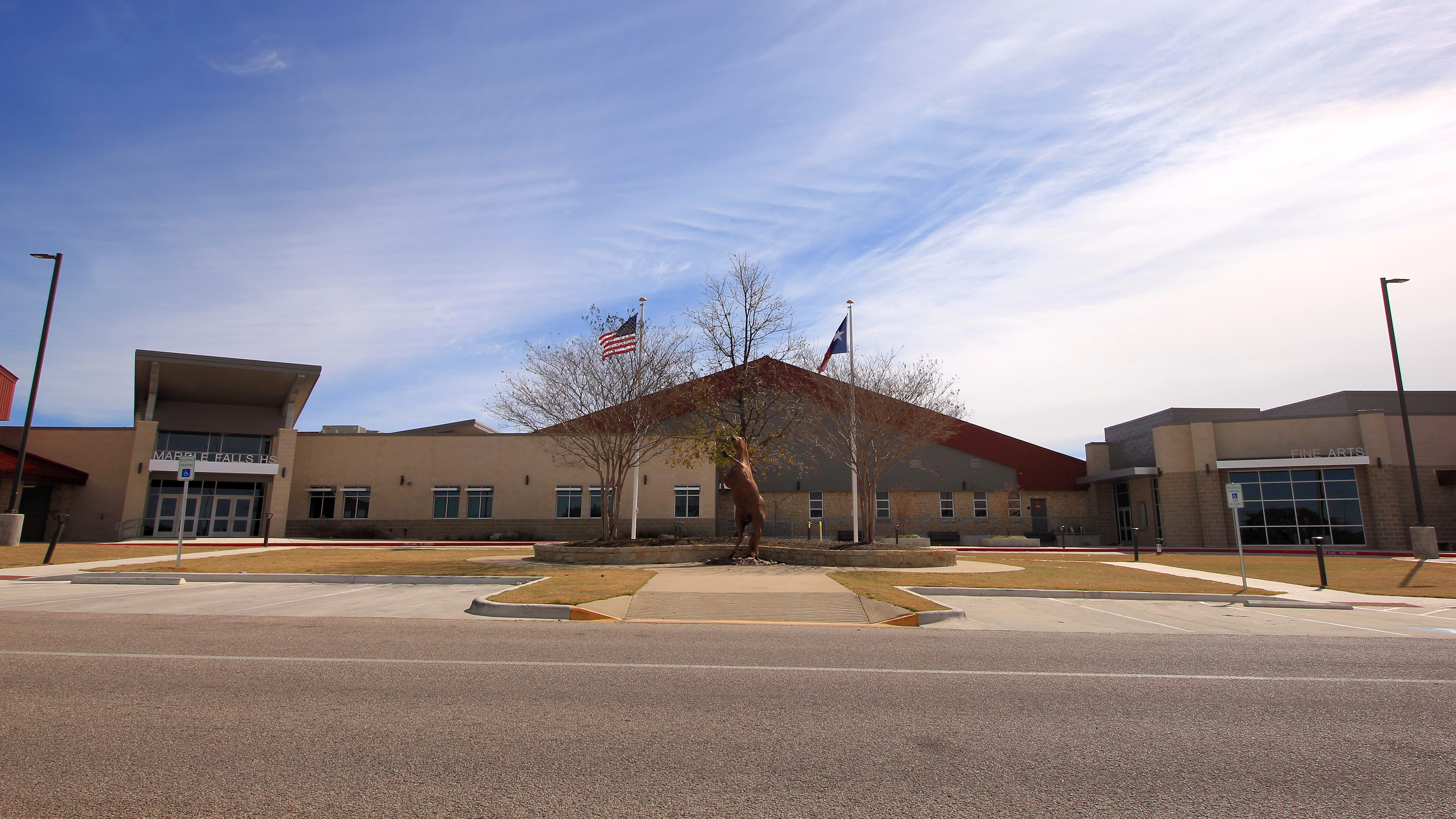

Location
- 2101 Mustang Dr; Marble Falls, Texas 78654; United States

Information
- School type: Public high school
- School district: Marble Falls Independent School District
- Faculty: 83.09 (on an FTE basis)
- Enrollment: 1,172 (2025-2026)
- Student to teacher ratio: 13.58
- Colors: Purple and gold
- Athletics conference: UIL Class 4A
- Mascot: Mustangs
- Website: Marble Falls High School

Marble Falls High School (MFHS) is a public high school in Marble Falls, Texas, USA, and a part of the Marble Falls Independent School District. The school is classified as a 4A school by the UIL. For the 2024–2025 school year, the school was given a "B" by the Texas Education Agency.

The school has an aerospace and engineering program for students interested in these career paths.
