= List of Recorded Texas Historic Landmarks =

The following are lists in a series of Recorded Texas Historic Landmarks (RTHLs) arranged by county as designated by the Texas Historical Commission and local county historical commissions in Texas. Purchase and display of a historical marker is a required component of the RTHL designation process.

- List of Recorded Texas Historic Landmarks (Anderson-Callahan), containing the counties of Anderson, Andrews, Angelina, Aransas, Archer, Armstrong, Atascosa, Austin, Bailey, Bandera, Bastrop, Baylor, Bee, Bell, Bexar, Blanco, Borden, Bosque, Bowie, Brazoria, Brazos, Brewster, Briscoe, Brooks, Brown, Burleson, Burnet, Caldwell, Calhoun, and Callahan.
- List of Recorded Texas Historic Landmarks (Cameron-Duval), containing the counties of Cameron, Camp, Carson, Cass, Castro, Chambers, Cherokee, Childress, Clay, Cochran, Coke, Coleman, Collin, Collingsworth, Colorado, Comal, Comanche, Concho, Cooke, Coryell, Cottle, Crane, Crockett, Crosby, Culberson, Dallam, Dallas, Dawson, DeWitt, Deaf Smith, Delta, Denton, Dickens, Dimmit, Donley, and Duval.
- List of Recorded Texas Historic Landmarks (Eastland-Gray), containing the counties of Eastland, Ector, Edwards, El Paso, Ellis, Erath, Falls, Fannin, Fayette, Fisher, Floyd, Foard, Fort Bend, Franklin, Freestone, Frio, Gaines, Galveston, Garza, Gillespie, Glasscock, Goliad, Gonzales, and Gray.
- List of Recorded Texas Historic Landmarks (Grayson-Hudspeth), containing the counties of Grayson, Gregg, Grimes, Guadalupe, Hale, Hall, Hamilton, Hansford, Hardeman, Hardin, Harris, Harrison, Hartley, Haskell, Hays, Hemphill, Henderson, Hidalgo, Hill, Hockley, Hood, Hopkins, Houston, Howard, and Hudspeth.
- List of Recorded Texas Historic Landmarks (Hunt-Martin), containing the counties of Hunt, Hutchinson, Irion, Jack, Jackson, Jasper, Jeff Davis, Jefferson, Jim Hogg, Jim Wells, Johnson, Jones, Karnes, Kaufman, Kendall, Kenedy, Kent, Kerr, Kimble, King, Kinney, Kleberg, Knox, La Salle, Lamar, Lamb, Lampasas, Lavaca, Lee, Leon, Liberty, Limestone, Lipscomb, Live Oak, Llano, Loving, Lubbock, Lynn, Madison, Marion, and Martin.
- List of Recorded Texas Historic Landmarks (Mason-Rusk), containing the counties of Mason, Matagorda, Maverick, McCulloch, McLennan, McMullen, Medina, Menard, Midland, Milam, Mills, Mitchell, Montague, Montgomery, Moore, Morris, Motley, Nacogdoches, Navarro, Newton, Nolan, Nueces, Ochiltree, Oldham, Orange, Palo Pinto, Panola, Parker, Parmer, Pecos, Polk, Potter, Presidio, Rains, Randall, Reagan, Real, Red River, Reeves, Refugio, Roberts, Robertson, Rockwall, Runnels, and Rusk.
- List of Recorded Texas Historic Landmarks (Sabine-Travis), containing the counties of Sabine, San Augustine, San Jacinto, San Patricio, San Saba, Schleicher, Scurry, Shackelford, Shelby, Sherman, Smith, Somervell, Starr, Stephens, Sterling, Stonewall, Sutton, Swisher, Tarrant, Taylor, Terrell, Terry, Throckmorton, Titus, Tom Green, and Travis.
- List of Recorded Texas Historic Landmarks (Trinity-Zavala), containing the counties of Trinity, Tyler, Upshur, Upton, Uvalde, Val Verde, Van Zandt, Victoria, Walker, Waller, Ward, Washington, Webb, Wharton, Wheeler, Wichita, Wilbarger, Willacy, Williamson, Wilson, Winkler, Wise, Wood, Yoakum, Young, Zapata, and Zavala.
