= Marble Falls, Texas =

- City
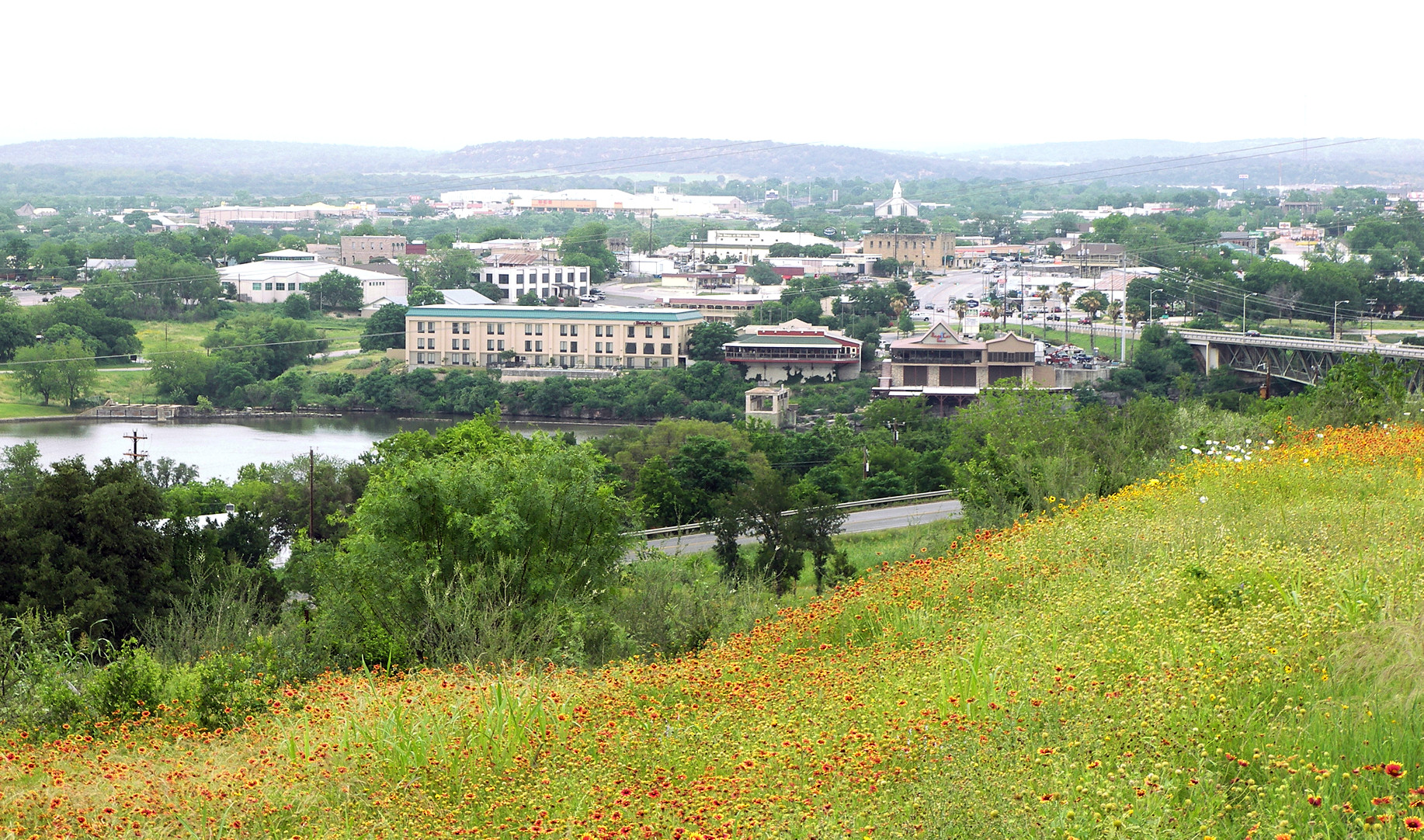
- Hill view of Marble Falls, 2007
- Nickname: Marble
- Motto: "Lakeside Charm with Downtown Flair"
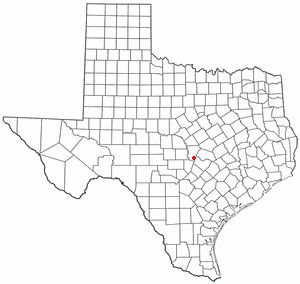
- Location of Marble Falls, Texas

- Coordinates: 30°34′N 98°17′W
- Country: United States
- State: Texas
- County: Burnet

Area
  - Total: 15.16 sq mi (39.26 km^{2})
  - Land: 14.51 sq mi (37.59 km^{2})
  - Water: 0.64 sq mi (1.67 km^{2})
- Elevation: 801 ft (244 m)

Population (2020)
  - Total: 7,037
  - Estimate (2025): 9,633
  - Density: 484.9/sq mi (187.2/km^{2})
- Time zone: UTC-6 (Central (CST))
  - Summer (DST): UTC-5 (CDT)
- ZIP Codes: 78654, 78657
- Area code: 830
- FIPS code: 48-46584
- GNIS feature ID: 2411030
- Website: marblefallstx.gov

Marble Falls is a city in Burnet County, Texas, United States. As of the 2020 United States Census, the city population was 7,037. The 2025 population was estimated to be 9,415. Lake Marble Falls is part of the Highland Lakes on the Colorado River, the largest chain of lakes in Texas. Marble Falls was founded by Adam Rankin Johnson in 1887, a former Indian fighter and Confederate general.

== History ==
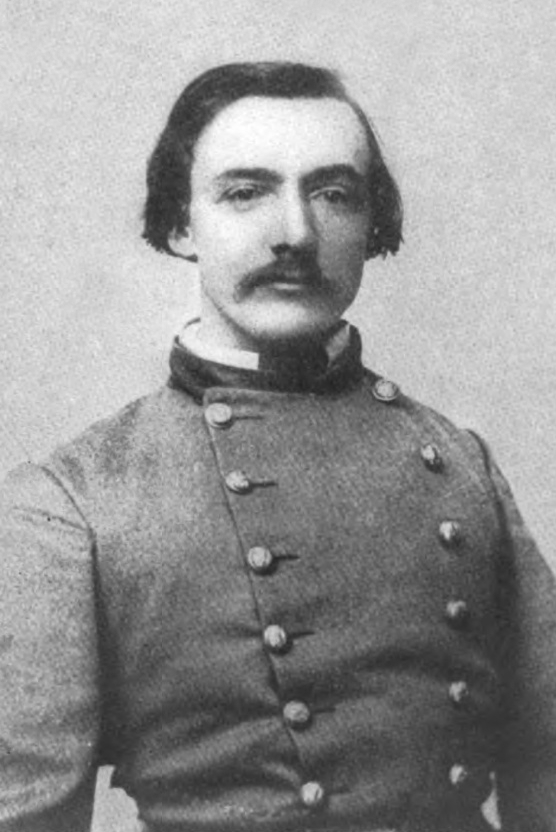
Adam Rankin "Stovepipe" Johnson, the founder of Marble Falls.

Marble Falls was founded in 1887 by Adam Rankin "Stovepipe" Johnson, a former Indian fighter and Confederate general. Johnson had visited the natural marble falls during his pre-war days as a Burnet County surveyor, and wanted to build an industrial city powered by the Colorado River. Johnson facilitated the construction of a railroad to nearby Granite Mountain in 1884, and helped plat the Marble Falls townsite. The sale of lots began in 1887, and Johnson built a home, a college, and a factory near the falls. The town grew to a population of 1,800 within ten years.

In 1917, Marble Falls elected Ophelia Crosby "Birdie" Harwood as the first woman mayor in Texas, three years before women were allowed to vote.

When the Max Starcke Dam was completed in 1951, the marble falls which had given the town its name were submerged under the new Lake Marble Falls. The town's economy declined through the drought of the 1950s, and prospered as a tourism and retirement location, beginning in the 1970s. Beginning in the 1980s, Marble Falls has grown into the retail and entertainment center for the Highland Lakes area.

== Geography ==
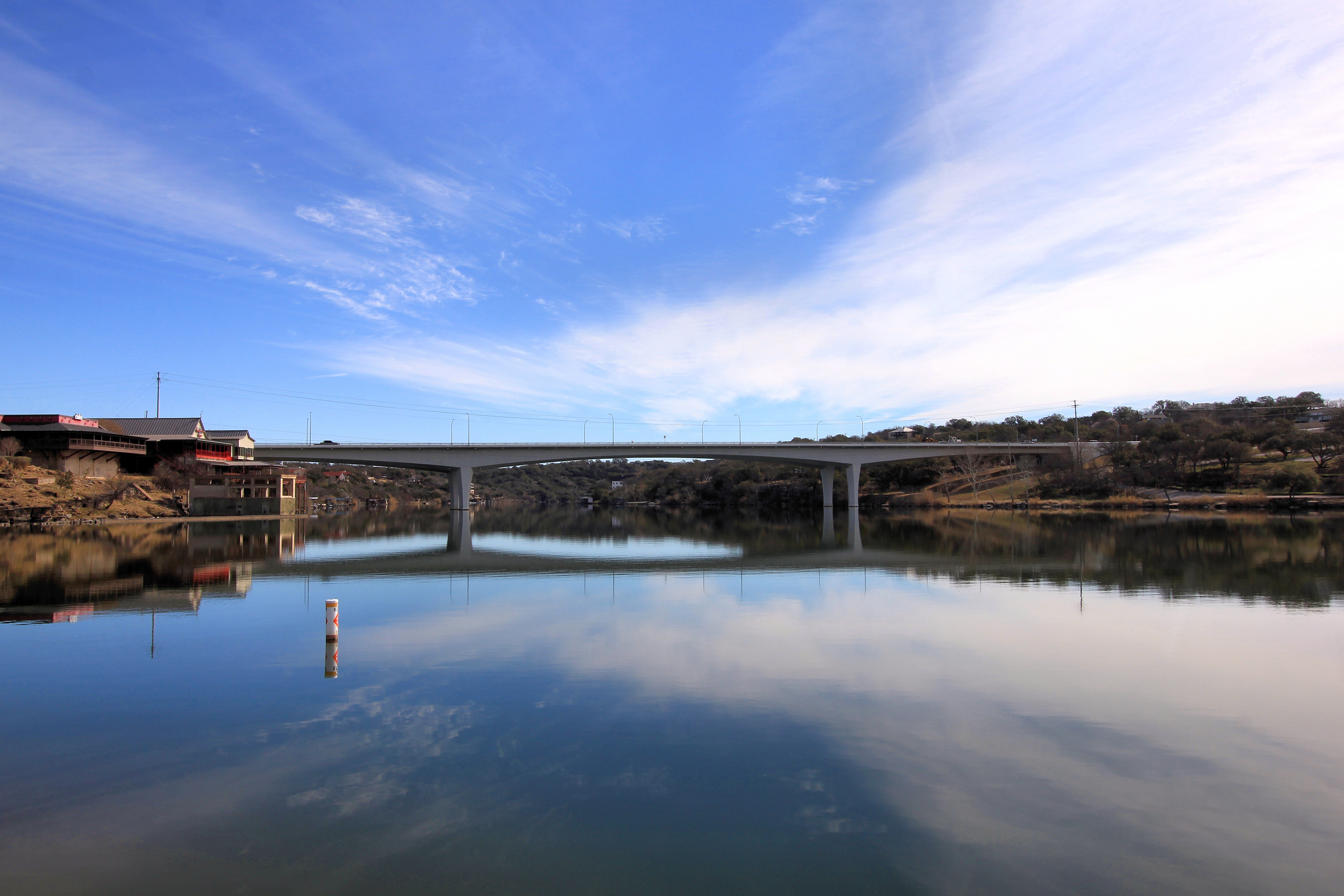
Lake Marble Falls in Marble Falls.

Marble Falls is located on the banks of Lake Marble Falls. According to the Handbook of Texas website, the former falls were flooded by the lake, which was created by a shelf of limestone running diagonally across the Colorado River from northeast to southwest. The upper layer of limestone, brownish on the exterior but a deep blue inside, was so hard and cherty it was mistaken for marble. The falls were actually three distinct formations at the head of a canyon 1.25 miles (2.01 km) long, with a drop of some 50 feet (15 m) through the limestone strata. The natural lake and waterfall were covered when the Colorado River was dammed with the completion of Max Starcke Dam in 1951. Lake Marble Falls sits between Lake Lyndon B. Johnson to the north and Lake Travis to the south. The falls for which the city is named are now underwater but are revealed every few years when the lake is lowered.

Equally noteworthy is the huge igneous batholith called Granite Mountain looming on the town's western edge that secured Marble Falls' place in Texas history. 188,518 cubic feet of the famed pink granite was used for the construction of the Texas State Capitol in 1886. The granite can also be found in other state government office buildings, and in the Galveston Seawall and Austin–Bergstrom International Airport.

According to the United States Census Bureau, the city has a total area of 12.2 square miles (31.6 km^{2}), of which 11.6 square miles (30.0 km^{2}) is land and 0.62 square miles (1.6 km^{2}), or 5.21%, is water.

== Demographics ==
Historical population
Census	Pop.	Note	%±
1890	587		—
1910	1,061		—
1920	630		−40.6%
1930	865		37.3%
1940	1,021		18.0%
1950	2,044		100.2%
1960	2,161		5.7%
1970	2,209		2.2%
1980	3,252		47.2%
1990	4,007		23.2%
2000	4,959		23.8%
2010	6,077		22.5%
2020	7,037		15.8%
2025 (est.)	9,633		36.9%
U.S. Decennial Census

=== 2020 census ===
As of the 2020 census, Marble Falls had a population of 7,037 people in 2,944 households, including 1,664 families residing in the city. The median age was 40.6 years. 22.1% of residents were under the age of 18 and 22.1% of residents were 65 years of age or older. For every 100 females there were 91.1 males, and for every 100 females age 18 and over there were 86.0 males age 18 and over.

84.0% of residents lived in urban areas, while 16.0% lived in rural areas.

There were 2,944 households in Marble Falls, of which 27.6% had children under the age of 18 living in them. Of all households, 40.1% were married-couple households, 19.9% were households with a male householder and no spouse or partner present, and 34.2% were households with a female householder and no spouse or partner present. About 35.0% of all households were made up of individuals and 17.1% had someone living alone who was 65 years of age or older.

There were 3,270 housing units, of which 10.0% were vacant. The homeowner vacancy rate was 1.6% and the rental vacancy rate was 8.0%.

Racial composition as of the 2020 census
Race	Number	Percent
White	5,093	72.4%
Black or African American	149	2.1%
American Indian and Alaska Native	61	0.9%
Asian	161	2.3%
Native Hawaiian and Other Pacific Islander	2	0.0%
Some other race	673	9.6%
Two or more races	898	12.8%
Hispanic or Latino (of any race)	1,905	27.1%

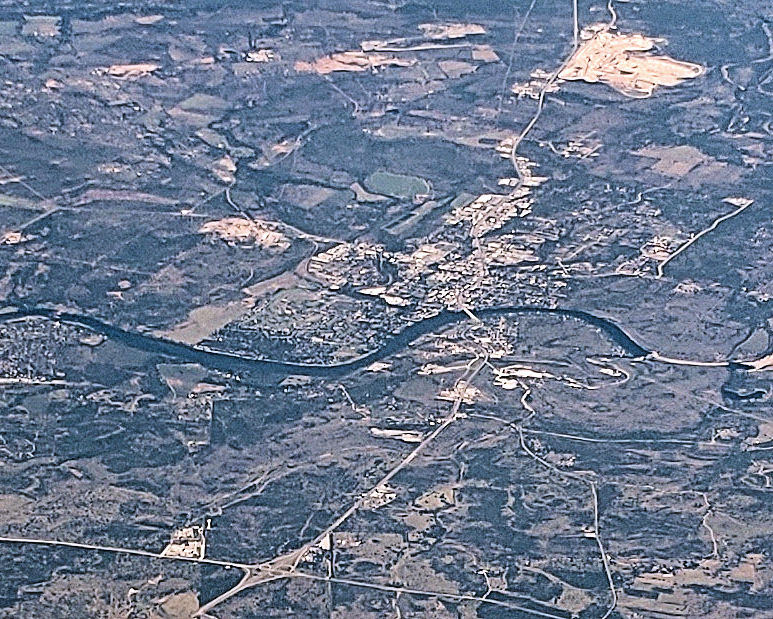
Aerial view of Marble Falls, Texas

=== 2010 census ===
As of the census of 2010, there were 6,077 people, 2,486 households, and 1,542 families residing in the city. There were 28,235 housing units. The racial makeup of the city was 83.1% White, 3.9% African American, 0.7% Native American, 0.8% Asian, 9.1% from other races, and 2.4% from two or more races. Hispanic or Latino of any race were 24.2% of the population.

There were 2,486 households, out of which 29.8% had children under the age of 18 living with them, 42% were married couples living together, 14.6% had a female householder with no husband present, and 38% were non-families. The average household size was 2.41 and the average family size was 3.08.

Marble Falls, as of December 1, 2009, is the anchor of the Marble Falls, TX Micropolitan Statistical Area. The census bureau has defined this area as including all of Burnet County and has a total population of 42,896. The micropolitan area, due to close ties to nearby Austin, is a component of the Austin-Round Rock-Marble Falls, TX Consolidated Statistical Area.

== Education ==
Marble Falls Independent School District operates public schools, including Marble Falls High School.

Post-secondary institutions

- Texas Tech University at Highland Lakes
- Central Texas College – Marble Falls

== Notable people ==
- J. Frank Dobie (1888–1964), folklorist, writer, and newspaper columnist owned a ranch in Marble Falls
- Gerald Lyda (1923–2005), general contractor and cattle rancher, born and raised in Marble Falls
- Leonel Manzano, silver medal winner in the 1500 m at the 2012 London Olympics
- John Arthur Martinez, second-place winner on USA Network's Nashville Star
- David Morgan, tight end for the Minnesota Vikings
