= James Oakley (politician) =

American politician from Texas

County Judge Burnet County, Texas
- Incumbent
- Assumed office January 1, 2015
- Preceded by: Donna Klaeger

County Commissioner Precinct 4, Burnet County, Texas
- In office January 1, 1999 – December 31, 2006
- Preceded by: Craig Seward
- Succeeded by: Joe Don Dockery

Member of the Regional Review Committee for HUD Community Development Block Grants
- Incumbent
- Assumed office 2000
- Appointed by: Governor George W. Bush

Member of the Texas Commission on Law Enforcement
- Incumbent
- Assumed office 2009
- Appointed by: Governor Rick Perry

Personal details
- Born: Burnet County, Texas
- Party: Republican
- Spouse(s): Julie Oakley, City Manager, Lakeway, Texas
- Children: 5
- Education: Southwest Texas State University

James Oakley is the former County Judge for Burnet County, Texas, and former chair of the Commissioners' Court. He served eight years in local government as a County Commissioner for precinct 4 (1999–2006). He is a board member of the Pedernales Electric Cooperative and the Capital Area Metropolitan Planning Organization. Former Governor George W. Bush appointed Oakley to the regional review committee for Community Development Block Grants, and he was appointed to the Texas Commission on Law Enforcement by former Governor Rick Perry.

Oakley's role is primarily administrative, as the Commissioners' Court's responsibilities include budgeting, overseeing local law and order, levying property taxes, and road maintenance. Since becoming County Judge, Oakley has negotiated the purchase of Burnet County Jail from the bondholders, thereby addressing a financial problem that emerged under the previous administration. He is also a strong advocate for the building of a bridge over the Colorado River below Wirtz Dam, which has been included on Burnet County transportation plans since 1974 and would improve road transportation on a local and state level.

In 2016, Oakley was involved in a controversy following the shooting of Benjamin Marconi when he posted a controversial and racially charged comment on Facebook under a mug shot of the suspect, implying that he should be lynched. Oakley quickly deleted the post and apologized for his "unfortunate" choice of words in an "off the cuff" reaction, and explained that his intent was to express his views on the senseless murder of a police officer and that his view was unrelated to ethnicity. While County Judges do have some judicial responsibilities and Oakley's predecessor did handle some criminal matters, he emphasized that he is an administrative rather than a criminal judge. The increase in prejudiced sentiment being expressed in the immediate aftermath of the 2016 presidential election likely influenced the strength of the response to Oakley's comment.

Oakley was elected to the board of directors of the Pedernales Electric Cooperative in June 2013, becoming President in June 2015. He was re-elected in June 2016 and appointed as Vice-President. Following his Facebook comment after the Marconi shooting, another director of the cooperative made a formal complaint and a board sub-committee was appointed at the end of November 2016 to investigate and report back. The board will decide on Oakley's fate, but could choose to dismiss him, though he did not face re-election until June 2019. The complaint against Oakley has been described as politically-motivated by his Republican supporters, though Democrats respond that the issue is one which transcends politics.

== Early life ==
Oakley is a native of Burnet and a fifth-generation Texan. He attended Burnet High School before graduating from Southwest Texas State University with a Bachelor's degree in Business Administration; the university has subsequently become Texas State University.

=== Family ===
Oakley's wife, Julie, is a Certified Public Accountant licensed in the state of Texas. James and Julie live on Lake Travis in the Spicewood area and attend Lake Hills Church in Bee Cave.

== Career ==
After college, he worked in public relations and corporate communications for ten years. Oakley has been active in community roles, serving with the Capital Area Council of Governments, the Texas Colorado Flood Plain Coalition, and as President of his Property Owner's Association.

=== County Commissioner ===
Each county in Texas is presided over by a Commissioners' Court of four County Commissioners and the County Judge, plus the County clerk as a non-voting ex officio member. This body is responsible for administration of the county, controlling the county tax rate, the budget for its responsible departments, and exercising oversight over subsidiary boards and commissions. The County Judge is the "chief legislator and executive" and presides over meetings but has no veto power, and the court makes decisions by simply majority. The Commissioners' Court is quorate with three voting members (except for levying tax where four members are required). In 1998, Oakley was elected as County Commissioner for Burnet's fourth precinct, replacing Craig Seward and becoming the first Republican elected to that position since the Civil War. Oakley served on the Commissioners' Court for two terms, from the start of 1999 until the end of 2006, when he was replaced by Joe Don Dockery.

In 2000, Bush appointed Oakley to a Capital Area Council of Governments-hosted review committee for Community Development Block Grants, a position he continued to hold in 2016. This grant program is overseen by the U.S. Department of Housing and Urban Development and operates affordable housing, anti-poverty, and infrastructure development programs. Perry appointed Oakley for the 79th legislative session to the rock crushers and quarries advisory committee and then in 2009 to the Texas Commission on Law Enforcement (TCOLE) for an eight-year term. TCOLE's mission is "ensuring a Texas where people are served by highly trained and ethical law enforcement and corrections personnel through screening, developing, monitoring resources, and setting standards."

=== Pedernales Electric Cooperative ===
The Pedernales Electric Cooperative (PEC) is a Texas-based utility cooperative serving 24 counties. With 2016 revenue of US$590 million and serving about 240,000 members, PEC is the largest member-owned electric utility in the United States. Elections are held annually for three-year terms on the Board of Directors. Oakley was elected to the Board in June 2013 and served as Board President for the 2015-16 year. Upon re-election, he was selected as Vice President for the 2016-17 year and could not face re-election until June 2019.

Oakley's 2016 re-election was contentious, with his opponent claiming he had a conflict of interest between his Board position and his other responsibilities for Burnet County, but he was re-elected easily. Oakley developed a contentious relationship with Larry Landaker, the pair disagreeing over changes to methods of election. Landaker left the Board in 2015 and now runs "PEC Truth Watch," through which he has campaigned for Oakley to resign or be removed from the Board.

=== County Judge ===
After eight years away from the Commissioners' Court and representing Texas with GovDeals.com, the largest internet-based organization dealing with the public disposition of government assets, Oakley stood for selection as the Texas Republican Party candidate for Judge of the Burnet County Court. He announced his candidacy on the same day that incumbent County Judge Donna Klaeger declared that she was not standing for re-election, praising her accomplishments and expressing the hope to "continue her work." The primary was held on March 4, 2014, and his opponents were Linda D. Rogers, a former chair of the Burnet Republican Party, and George Russell, Mayor of Marble Falls; Oakley received 47.6% of the vote. A primary runoff was held against Russell in May, as no candidate had received a majority of votes, and Oakley prevailed with 63.9% of the vote. Oakley was unopposed in the general election and began his four-year term as County Judge on January 1, 2015, replacing Donna Klaeger who had served two terms and was Burnet's first female County Judge. During his term, Oakley is Burnet's highest elected official and presides over the Commissioners' Court. As County Judge, he serves as a statutory member on certain boards including the election commission, and is responsible for civil defense and emergency management for Burnet.

The Texas County Courts are a creation of sections 15 to 17 of Article V of the Constitution of Texas, established with original and appellate functions "as provided by law" (section 16). This covers "Class A" and "Class B" misdemeanors (offenses that can involve jail time), civil cases concerning small to moderate amounts, and cases on appeal from justice of the peace and district / municipal court cases. The limitation "as provided by law" applies both to the jurisdiction of the Court and the judicial functions of the County Judge, and so can be limited by legislative action. The Texas Legislature has created County Courts-at-law and transferred to them much of the judicial authority and responsibility originally held by the Constitutional County Courts. The County Judge presiding over both the Commissioners' Court and the Constitutional County Court does not require qualifications in the discipline of law – in 2015, for example, only 16% were licensed to practice law – but Judges of the County Courts-at-Law must be lawyers. It is left to individual counties to decide whether to strip the County Judge of all judicial responsibilities, and in counties where this has not occurred, the County Judge may view the County Courts-at-law as supplements to, rather than replacements of, the Constitutional County Court's judicial functions. Burnet County has not taken this step; Klaeger, Oakley's predecessor, presided over some misdemeanor-level criminal court cases during her time as County Judge. County Judges undertaking judicial activities draw a supplemental salary, and in 2011 the Houston Chronicle reported that 85% of counties had judges drawing this stipend. The judicial education officer at the Texas Association of Counties, David Hodges, has noted that the rate of cases being overturned is higher for both the County Courts-at-law and for District Court judges than it is for County Judges. Like most County Judges, Oakley can be described as his County's Chief Executive Officer with responsibilities that are primarily administrative and a role that is political, but he does exercise limited judicial functions, retaining the authority to conduct marriages and to conduct administrative hearings.

Burnet County Judge James Oakley resigned on January 2, 2025, following a public reprimand issued by the Texas State Commission on Judicial Conduct on December 11, 2024.

==== Wirtz Dam Bridge ====
Since he first joined the Commissioners' Court in 1988, Oakley has advocated the desirability of a bridge over the Colorado River below Wirtz Dam to link FM 1431 and FM 2347 as a way to relieve traffic on U.S. Route 281. The proposal was first included on the Burnet County transportation plan in 1974 but has repeatedly encountered funding obstacles, but Oakley declared it as one of priorities just before his first meeting as County Judge. Oakley acted on another priority before being sworn in, taking direct control of marketing and tourism for the County. Commissioner Neve was concerned by Oakley's actions, reminding him that a County Judge he may be in charge of personnel, but that policy was determined collectively by the Commissioner's Court. In particular, Neve pointed out that there was already an agreed priority list for road projects, that the Wirtz Dam Bridge was ranked 24th, and that as County Judge, Oakley should support it until there is sufficient support for the Court to change priorities. By mid-2016, Oakley had won funding for preliminary works, gained the support of the Capital Area Metropolitan Planning Organization (CAMPO, where he serves on the transportation policy and executive boards), seen the initiation of public consultations, and the benefits for reduced law enforcement and emergency medical services response times were being touted. Oakley is pushing for the approximately US$20 million project to be taken up by the Texas Department of Transportation because of the benefits for US 281.

==== Burnet County Jail ====
In 2008, Burnet County issues bonds to support the construction of Burnet County Jail, to be operated by LaSalle Southwestern Corrections. The deal ultimately involved the County leasing 120 of the facility's 587 beds, with a price per prisoner incarcerated at a rate favorable rate to the County. The facility has had a checkered history, with escapes, claims of construction flaws, and adverse findings from the Texas Commission on Jail Standards. Coupled with other financial difficulties, the adverse preliminary finding in the IRS investigation of the tax-free status of the bonds led LaSalle to terminate the contract. Burnet County was forced to take control of an overly large facility on which it had lost money and revenue in March 2014, as a replacement for LaSalle could not be found. Though it was helpful that the IRS decided not revoke the tax-exempt status of the bonds, the facility was still facing cash flow deficiencies into the future. This situation was a serious problem confronting Oakley on his election, and he says the situation taught him "to make lemonade from lemons." In a deal announced in March and concluded in July 2016, the County purchased the jail from the bond holders for $14 million (equivalent to 38 to 39 cents on the dollar), and are now marketing bed space to the U.S. Marshals Service and nearby counties facing overcrowding problems in their own detention facilities.

=== Facebook comment controversy ===
==== Shooting of Benjamin Marconi ====
On November 20, 2016, San Antonio Police Department Detective Benjamin Marconi was shot and killed by an otherwise uninvolved passerby who stopped his car, got out, and shot Marconi while he was writing a traffic ticket in his patrol car. Otis Tyrone McKane was suspected of being the shooter and was arrested the day after the shooting and charged with capital murder.

The San Antonio Police Department posted McKane's mug shot to Facebook with an announcement of his arrest, and Oakley shared the photo and commented that it was "Time for a tree and a rope...", a juxtaposition which clearly evoked the specter of lynching. Oakley subsequently apologized, calling his reaction "off the cuff," "curt and harsh," and described his choice of words as "unfortunate." His apology was subsequently described as "fake" and as "NOT an apology ... [and] not even a very good excuse" on a piece cross-posted to the progressive blog Crooks and Liars Oakley added that a more appropriate posting would have been "a comment that more clearly reflects my opinion on the cowardly crime of the senseless murder of a law enforcement officer," and declared this his view of McKane "is the same regardless of ethnicity." When contacted by the Huffington Post, Oakley stated that he did not intend to make a racially charged comment, and that "I never made that connection but I do see how somebody could make that connection and be offended towards that. That was not my intent. Maybe I watched too many Westerns when I was little." In defending himself, Oakley noted that, as an administrative judge, he "[does] not preside over criminal court." In an addition described as not doing himself any favors, Oakley explained that he is a supporter of the death penalty "in cases where the ultimate crime has been committed and there is clear and complete evidence and where all steps of the judicial process have been respected" and in line with due process.

Oakley's comments drew widespread attention and criticism raising questions of his fitness for the position of County Judge. The Southern Poverty Law Center produced a report, Ten Days After, which reported incidence of harassment and intimidation in the immediate post-election period; 23% of these were classified as "anti-black" in which references to lynching were described as common. The Department of Justice is already investigating an increase in hate crimes. It is unclear whether suggestions of Oakley's resignation or impeachment will spread beyond progressive / liberal blogs and commentators and into the mainstream media, though there were calls for Oakley to be removed from the CAMPO board and a motion was put to the PEC board calling for his actions to be investigated, suggesting that the controversy may hamper Oakley's future ambitions. The Texas Monthly included Oakley's actions in an article on "Judges Gone Wild" in December 2016.

==== PEC board membership ====
The PEC made a statement distancing the organization from Oakley's comments shortly after they were made. Landaker, through PEC Truth Watch, branded Oakley as a racist (a term also used by Juanita Jean) and continues to advocate for his removal from the Board and has added a call for him to resign from his position as County Judge. PEC officials called an emergency meeting after an official complaint was filed against Oakley by Cristi Clement, another of the directors. Republican supporters of Oakley argued that the complaint was politically motivated as Clement is a Democrat, declaring that "active local Democrats have been instrumental in working with director Clement on seizing this unfounded opportunity to try to unseat Judge Oakley (from the PEC board)." Democrats defend that it is an issue which transcends politics and that the "people who are the most offended are not necessarily people representing the Democrat party but those representing the African-American community." Oakley has since speculated that moves to unseat him may be partisan, and stated that he has been surprised and overwhelmed by the many letters of support which he has received, and reiterated that he is not planning to resign his directorship.

A public meeting of the PEC board was held on November 30, at which Oakley had an opportunity to make an address before public submissions were received and the board members then retired to an executive session. Oakley explained that his comments weren't intended as a call for "instant vigilante justice," which was an interpretation of his words that did not occur to him because "due process is an assumption in my mind"; he also requested "humble forgiveness" for "a mistake on my part that I own." The emergency meeting heard from PEC employees and managers that Oakley's actions had created a hostile working environment and that employees were afraid to speak about his comments for fear of retaliation. Oakley referred to his role with TCOLE to explain his strong instinct to protect people working in law enforcement (he repeated this his post was expressing his anger and frustration over Marconi's killing) but a former police officer responded to him directly, saying that he has encouraged violence and "put a target on [law enforcement officers'] backs" and "made their job more seriously dangerous." His claim to be speaking of the crime and not the perpetrator was greeted with scepticism, one stating: "Time for a tree and a rope. For crying out loud, I think we all know what that means. We're going to lynch someone." Amongst the 23 people who contributed public comments, 14 argued for Oakley's removal from the Board, while nine defended him, inclined to forgive Oakley and speaking of his good character. One defender stated the Oakley "was using a figure of speech, poorly chosen, everybody gets that, but he wasn't talking about a lynching. ... He was talking about old west Texas justice. Go watch a few western movies will ya?" Comments were also made that "[t]here's not a racist bone in [Oakley's]" and that Oakley's critics were "just up here making trouble." A reporter for DailyTrib.com (formerly the local newspaper the River Cities Tribune) described the scene when Reneé Semien spoke while fighting back tears, with African-American PEC employees and others gathered around her and with audience members standing in support, saying: "Director Oakley felt that it was appropriate to call for the lynching of a black man accused of a crime. For those ignorant of United States history, black men were lynched to instill fear and compliance in the black population for centuries. ... This is a human decency issue. Black employees should not and are not the only ones who have a problem with what Director Oakley did. It is not acceptable and should not be tolerated."

At the executive session, the board accepted Clement's complaint and appointed a three-member committee to report back on the complaint against Oakley by December 9, the three members being PEC Board President Emily Pataki and directors Kathy Scanlon and Paul Graf (who is the board's secretary/treasurer). The panel could recommend that Oakley be dismissed or reprimanded, with a meeting to decide on January 17. The PEC issued a written statement announcing the review, and affirming that the organization "does not condone any type of offensive language. Consistent with our cooperative values, we proudly welcome and serve all members." The three-member committee took further public submissions on December 7 for about 75 minutes, then went into executive session for about three hours with their special counsel. Oakley was waiting outside the meeting, and approached Scanlon when she emerged from the executive session, asking if they were done; Scanlon continued walking but said "You're a dishonourable man" to Oakley and reportedly stormed off. The Special Counsel subsequently made a statement that the "committee does its work and reports its findings to the board. The board will make the final decision on the matter. The board can agree, disagree, or amend the committee's recommendation." The report will not be made public until included in materials for the PEC Directors for an upcoming board meeting, and any removal involves a 30-day process and so cannot be finalised until January 2017. There has been speculation that a decision may not been reached for several months, and that the board may be concerned about Oakley's action being a reminder of controversies which resulted in criminal convictions. The committee is being lobbied by activists such as John Watson, who has declared to the board that:

Should you fail to recommend the removal of Director Oakley for his inappropriate and unacceptable Facebook posting ... you will be, in effect, condoning his behaviour ... That is a terrible message to send ... And it would reflect poorly on the PEC as an organization. It would amount to a dereliction of duty on the part of each Board member refusing to take the right and decent stand that Mr. Oakley's continued presence on the Board has become unsustainable and unacceptable.

==== Sexual Harassment Allegations ====
In December 2024, the Texas State Commission on Judicial Conduct issued a reprimand against Oakley, citing violations of courthouse security protocols and allegations of inappropriate conduct. According to the commission's findings, Oakley engaged in unsolicited physical contact and made inappropriate comments toward Justice of the Peace Lisa Whitehead. The report further suggested that similar behavior had been directed toward other individuals in the courthouse and community. The commission concluded that Oakley’s actions created a hostile work environment and undermined public trust in the judiciary. Oakley has denied the allegations, stating that they are politically motivated.
