= List of people executed in Iowa =

The following is a list of people executed by the U.S. state of Iowa from 1834 to 1963.

Capital punishment was abolished in Iowa in 1965. 46 people, all of them men, were executed in Iowa from 1834 to 1963, all by hanging with one exception by firing squad. In 2020, Dustin Lee Honken was federally executed at USP Terre Haute in Indiana by lethal injection for crimes committed in Iowa.

== State executions ==
=== 1834–1888 ===
Name	Race	Age	Date of Execution	County	Crime	Victim(s)	Governor
Patrick O'Connor	White		June 30, 1834	Dubuque	Murder	George O'Keefe, white	N/A (Note: Then part of Wisconsin Territory.)
Joseph Jackson	White		July 15, 1842	Jackson	Murder	Xenophon Perkins, white	John Chambers (Note: As governor of Iowa Territory.)
William Hodge	White		July 15, 1845	Lee	Murder-Burglary	John Miller and Mr. Leicy, white	John Chambers
Stephen Hodge	White		July 15, 1845	Lee	Murder-Burglary	John Miller and Mr. Leicy, white	John Chambers
William McCauley	White		April 4, 1846	Van Buren (Note: Change of venue from Washington County.)	Murder	Don Ferdinand Coffman, white	James Clarke
William Hinkle	White		August 13, 1858	Dubuque	Murder	Female, white (wife)	Ralph P. Lowe
Francis Gillick	White		April 27, 1860	Dubuque	Murder	Female, white (wife)	Samuel J. Kirkwood
Nies A. Johnson	White		May 18, 1860	Delaware	Murder-Robbery	Andrew Ostland, white	Samuel J. Kirkwood
Daniel Clifford	White	22	June 19, 1860	Dubuque	Murder-Robbery	Joseph Wood, white	Samuel J. Kirkwood
Benjamin McComb	White		February 17, 1865	Wapello	Murder	Laura J. Harvey, white	William M. Stone
Chester Bellows	White	28	December 16, 1887	Floyd	Murder	Alice Waterman, 16, white (niece)	William Larrabee
Henry Schmidt	White	20	January 15, 1888	Fayette	Murder	Abraham and Lucretia Peek, 72 and 61, white	William Larrabee

=== 1894–1962 ===
Starting in 1894, all executions in Iowa were carried out inside of the state penitentiary in Fort Madison.

Name	Race	Age	Date of Execution	County	Crime	Victim(s)	Governor
James Dooley	White	18	January 19, 1894	Adams	Murder-Rape	Lucinda and Nelly Coons, 45 and 10, white (aunt and cousin)	Frank D. Jackson
Jacob K. Cumberland	White	48	February 8, 1895	Shelby	Murder-Robbery	James and Jasper Robertson, 72 and 40, white (Note: Serial killer, previously murdered his own son Curtis (14) in Neosho County, Kansas in 1883 and sentenced to death but commuted and pardoned.)	Frank D. Jackson
Joseph C. Smith	Black	43	April 20, 1906	Monroe	Murder	Ida Canady, black (girlfriend)	Albert B. Cummins
John Junkins	Black	24	July 29, 1910	Appanoose (Note: Change of venue from Wapello County.)	Murder-Robbery	Clara Rosen, 29, white	Beryl F. Carroll
Ira Pavey	White	30	September 8, 1922	Sioux	Murder-Robbery	Claude Letner, 37, white	Nathan E. Kendall
Eugene Weeks	White	27	September 15, 1922	Polk	Murder-Robbery	George Fosdick, 58, white	Nathan E. Kendall
Orrie Cross	White	26	November 24, 1922	Polk	Murder-Robbery	George Fosdick, 58, white	Nathan E. Kendall
Earl Throst	White	26	March 9, 1923	Allamakee	Murder	Inga Magnusson, 21, white (love interest)	Nathan E. Kendall
William Olander	White	29	September 7, 1923	Webster	Murder-Robbery	Berthold Halfpap, 54, white	Nathan E. Kendall
Roy Maupin	Black	26	January 18, 1924	Polk	Murder-Robbery	Joseph Hayes, 27, white	Nathan E. Kendall
Archie Burris	Black	33	January 2, 1925	Wapello	Murder	Hattie Renfro Bates, 20, white (girlfriend)	Nathan E. Kendall
Harland Simons	White	26	November 16, 1925	Scott	Murder-Robbery	Orten Ferguson, 38, white	John Hammill
Joseph A. R. Altringer	White	23	November 6, 1931	Dubuque	Murder (Note: Victim sexually assaulted before murder.)	Earl Fuller Jr., 12, white	Dan W. Turner
Patrick Griffin	White	37	June 5, 1935	Black Hawk	Murder	Wendell F. Dilworth, 38, white (police officer)	Clyde L. Herring
Elmer Brewer	White	40	June 5, 1935	Black Hawk	Murder	Wendell F. Dilworth, 38, white (police officer)	Clyde L. Herring
Reginald S. Tracy	White	54	November 29, 1935	Delaware	Murder	Mabel Tracy, 53, white (wife)	Clyde L. Herring
John M. Mercer	White	29	January 24, 1938	Pottawattamie	Murder	Robert G. Sproat, 57, white (posse member)	Nelson G. Kraschel
Allen B. Wheaton	White	21	January 24, 1938	Cedar	Murder-Robbery-Kidnap	Henry Plummer, 38, white	Nelson G. Kraschel
Marlo Heinz	White	32	April 19, 1938	Wapello	Murder (Note: Victim sexually assaulted before murder.)	David Fox, 6, white (nephew)	Nelson G. Kraschel
Franz A. Jacobson	White	30	April 19, 1938	Dubuque	Murder	Catherine Elizabeth Leahy, 25, white (girlfriend)	Nelson G. Kraschel
Walter Rhodes	White	32	May 7, 1940	Johnson	Murder	Mabel Rhodes, 31, white (wife)	George A. Wilson
Ivan L. Sullivan	White	30	November 12, 1941	Lee	Murder	Robert Hart, 75, white (prison guard) (Note: Murdered during an escape attempt from the state penitentiary.)	George A. Wilson
Stanley M. Kaster	White	36	December 29, 1944	Bremer	Murder-Robbery	Glenn Winchell, 38, white	Bourke B. Hickenlooper
William Jarrett	White	54	February 23, 1945	Webster	Murder	Everett Warden, 48, white	Robert D. Blue
William H. Heincy	White	45	March 29, 1946	Dickinson	Murder-Burglary	Robert W. Raebel, 63, white	Robert D. Blue
Philip Heincy	White	73	March 29, 1946	Dickinson	Murder-Burglary	Robert W. Raebel, 63, white	Robert D. Blue
Corliss R. Bruntlett	White	52	July 6, 1949	Pottawattamie	Murder-Robbery	Percy J. Smith, 57, white	William S. Beardsley
Edward James Beckwith	White	31	August 4, 1952	Black Hawk (Note: Change of venue from Grundy County.)	Murder-Attempted rape	Irma Jean Klenzman Stahlhut, 22, white (love interest)	William S. Beardsley
Charles Noel Brown	White	29	July 24, 1962	Pottawattamie	Murder-Robbery	Alvin Koehrsen, 54, white (Note: Also murdered two other people that same week in Minnesota and Nebraska.)	Norman A. Erbe
Charles Edwin Kelley	White	21	September 6, 1962	Mills (Note: Change of venue.)	Murder-Robbery	Alvin Koehrsen, 54, white	Norman A. Erbe

== Federal and military executions ==
Name	Race	Age	Date of Execution	Jurisdiction	Location	Method	Crime(s)	Victim(s)	President
William C. Dowdy	White		September 9, 1864	Military	?	Firing squad	Absent without leave	N/A	Abraham Lincoln
Stanley Tramble	Black	31	July 5, 1918	Military	Camp Dodge	Hanging	Rape	Jessie Barnes, 17, white	Woodrow Wilson
Nelson Johnson	Black	30	July 5, 1918	Military	Camp Dodge	Hanging	Rape	Jessie Barnes, 17, white	Woodrow Wilson
Fred Allen	Black	22	July 5, 1918	Military	Camp Dodge	Hanging	Rape	Jessie Barnes, 17, white	Woodrow Wilson
Victor Feguer	White	27	March 15, 1963	Federal	Iowa State Penitentiary	Hanging	Kidnapping (Note: Victim died as a result of the crime.)	Edward Bartels, 34, white	John F. Kennedy
Dustin Lee Honken	White	52	July 17, 2020	Federal	USP Terre Haute (Note: Located in Terre Haute, Indiana; executed for crimes committed in Iowa.)	Lethal injection	Murder	Kandace Duncan and Amber Duncan, 10 and 6, white (Note: Also convicted of murdering Greg Nicholson (34, white), Lori Ann Duncan (31, white) and Terry DeGeus (32, white).)	Donald Trump

== See also ==
- Capital punishment in Iowa
