= Capital punishment in Iowa =

Capital punishment has been abolished in Iowa since 1965. Forty-five men were executed by hanging in Iowa between 1834 and 1963 for crimes including murder, rape, and robbery.

The first time that Iowa abolished the death penalty was in 1872, as a result of anti-death sentiment in the state, much due to Quaker, Unitarian and Universalist religious sentiment. By contrast, Presbyterians and Congregationalists advocated the retention of capital punishment, on biblical grounds. Anti-death penalty sentiment had been present in Iowa from its beginnings – first territorial Governor of Iowa Territory, Robert Lucas, at his first message to the Iowa Territorial Assembly in November 1838, advocated that capital punishment should be abolished. However, despite his advocacy, the Assembly passed legislation providing the death penalty for murder, to replace the existing legislation inherited from the Territory of Michigan providing for the same.

In 1846, the Chief Justice of the Iowa Territorial Supreme Court, Charles Mason, founded the Iowa Anti-Capital Punishment and Prison Discipline Society, which campaigned for the death penalty to be abolished. The Society supported a bill in 1847 to replace mandatory capital punishment for murder with discretionary (giving the jury the choice between death and life imprisonment); the bill passed the Senate but failed in the House. In 1851, both the House and Senate initially passed a new Criminal Code abolishing the death penalty; however, the intervention of a Presbyterian minister, Rev. Silas H. Hazzard, convinced the House to change its mind and reject the abolition, and after some disagreement the Senate relented and accepted the House's version of the Criminal Code with the death penalty still included. The Iowa Anti-Capital Punishment Society disbanded in 1851.

The 1872 abolition was triggered by the case of George Stanley, who had been convicted of murder and sentenced to hang; Catholics and Quakers lobbied Governor Cyrus C. Carpenter to grant clemency. Carpenter expressed personal opposition to the death penalty, but said that it would be improper for him to grant clemency based on his personal feelings. Four days before Stanley's scheduled execution, both houses of the Iowa State Legislature passed resolutions requesting clemency, on the grounds that they planned to legislate the abolition of the death penalty; the Governor responded to this with a reprieve of execution. Following this, legislation to abolish the death penalty was passed by the House and presented to the Senate; in the Senate, it encountered difficulty, and was rejected twice before finally being passed.

However, subsequent to the abolition there was an increasing incidence of lynching, which was widely blamed on the abolition, and led to its reinstatement in 1878. Iowa was the first ever state to reinstate the death penalty having previously abolished it.

In April 1957, Governor Herschel Loveless commuted the death sentence of 19-year-old Warren John Nutter, who had been sentenced to hang for the January 1956 murder of an Independence police officer. Loveless cited Nutter's youth, family background, and comparative sentences in other murder cases, marking a notable state commutation in the years prior to Iowa's 1965 abolition of capital punishment. Nutter ultimately served over 65 years in prison before his death in 2021, becoming the longest-serving inmate in the state's history.

The last execution to take place in Iowa was on March 15, 1963, at Iowa State Penitentiary, when Victor Harry Feguer was hanged for murder and kidnapping; however, Feguer's execution was under federal law; Feguer's execution was the last federal execution until Timothy McVeigh's in 2001. The last person to be executed in Iowa under Iowa state law was Charles Kelley on September 6, 1962.

Iowa abolished the death penalty for a second time in 1965, with a bill signed by Governor Harold Hughes. Since then, there have been repeated attempts to reinstate the death penalty, but none have managed to pass both houses of the Iowa State Legislature.

While the death penalty is abolished at a state level in Iowa, the death penalty applies throughout the United States, including Iowa, under federal law. In 2005, a federal court in Sioux City handed down the first death sentence in Iowa since the 1960s, to Dustin Honken and Angela Johnson. Johnson's death sentence was overturned on appeal in 2012, and she was re-sentenced to life in prison without the possibility of parole. Honken was executed on July 17, 2020, at United States Penitentiary, Terre Haute, becoming the third death row inmate to be executed since the Trump administration's resumption of federal executions.

== Reinstatement attempts ==
Then-Governor Terry Branstad made reinstatement of the death penalty a central focus of his 1994 re-election campaign; however, despite successfully being re-elected, he was unable to implement this policy due to opposition from Democrats in the Iowa State Senate.

In 2006, a Des Moines Register poll found 66% of Iowa adults favored reinstating the death penalty, while 29% opposed it.

In 2024 and 2025, a bill was proposed by Republican lawmakers to reinstate the death penalty exclusively for offences of first-degree murder committed against peace officers.

== See also ==
- Crime in Iowa
- List of people executed in Iowa
