= 2016 murders of Des Moines police officers =

Killings of police officers by Scott Michael Greene in Iowa

2016 shootings of Des Moines police officers
- Location: 41.636389°N 93.736111°W; Urbandale and Des Moines, Iowa, U.S.
- Date: November 2, 2016 c. 1:06 a.m. – c. 1:09 a.m. (CT)
- Target: Police officers in Iowa
- Attack type: Shooting, drive-by shooting
- Weapon: .223-caliber rifle
- Deaths: 2
- Injuries: 0
- Perpetrator: Scott Michael Greene

In the early hours of November 2, 2016, Des Moines Police Department officer Anthony Beminio and Urbandale Police Department officer Justin Martin were killed in separate "ambush-style" shootings in and near Des Moines, Iowa. The perpetrator in both shootings, identified as 46-year-old Scott Michael Greene of Urbandale, Iowa, was apprehended by police hours later. Greene pleaded guilty to two counts of first-degree murder and was sentenced to life without parole on May 20, 2017.

== Background and events ==
According to a report released in 2016 by the National Law Enforcement Officers Memorial Fund, 50 U.S. police officers were killed by homicide as of late July, representing a significant increase from the 33 officers murdered in 2015. The report also noted an increase of "ambush killings" targeting officers, with fourteen incidents recorded. Also in July 2016, there had been two mass shootings targeting police officers in Dallas, Texas, and Baton Rouge, Louisiana, in a ten-day period. Speaking for the Des Moines Police Department after the Des Moines-area shootings, Sergeant Paul Parizek noted, "There is a clear and present danger to police officers right now."

On November 2, 2016, Justin Martin, an Urbandale police officer, was killed shortly after 1:00 a.m. in Urbandale, located about 7.5 miles (12.1 km) northwest of Des Moines. Officers responding to a 1:06 report of shots being fired found him dead in his patrol car. About 20 minutes later, Sergeant Anthony Beminio, a Des Moines police officer, was found shot in his vehicle at a nearby intersection, about 2 miles (3.2 km) from the first scene. Beminio was taken to the Iowa Methodist Medical Center, where he died, according to Sergeant Parizek. Security footage of Beminio's death, time-stamped at about 1:09, depicted him being fired upon by a man who had driven a truck beside Beminio's vehicle.

== Victims ==
The two slain officers were identified as:

- Officer Justin Martin, 24, who had been with the department since 2015. He was believed to be the first officer of the Urbandale Police Department to be killed in the line of duty.
- Sergeant Anthony Beminio, 38, who had been with the department since 2005. He was the third officer of the Des Moines Police Department to be killed in the line of duty in 2016, following the March deaths of two officers in a head-on collision with an intoxicated driver on Interstate 80, and also the first officer to die from a homicide since 1977.

== Perpetrator ==
Scott Greene
- Born: Scott Michael Greene; August 14, 1970 (age 56)
- Occupation: None (former laborer)
- Criminal charge: First-degree murder
- Criminal penalty: Life without parole
- Criminal status: Incarcerated at Iowa State Penitentiary
- Children: 3
- Parent: Patricia Greene (mother)

Scott Michael Greene, 46, was identified by police as the sole suspect in both shootings through "a series of leads and investigative tips", including a vehicle description provided by a witness. He was a resident of Urbandale.

Less than two hours after his identification, the Dallas County Sheriff's Office and the Iowa State Patrol apprehended Greene at 9:15 a.m. According to police, he was found walking unarmed down G Trail at 320th Way, a gravel road in Wiscotta, located south of Redfield and some 35 miles (56 km) west of the shootings. He had flagged down an Iowa Department of Natural Resources officer and asked him to call 9-1-1. He was transported to a hospital after he complained of a preexisting health problem.

=== Personal life ===
Greene had three children from two relationships and was an employee at a furniture store from June 2006 to August 2013. Also, for three separate times in recent years, he had been a part-time worker at two local Ace Hardware stores.

In October 2016, he was hired by a small construction business in Ankeny that specialized in fences, even though he had no experience building fences. He had told the company that he "was pretty desperate" for a job and that he needed to support his teenage daughter. The company sent him home after three days "because he was not taking directions and wasn't working", and though it gave him the chance to return to work under a different crew, Greene quit instead. Afterwards, he posted a video on YouTube of a worker driving a truck, and claimed, in a written message below the video, that the company fired him after he reported unsafe driving.

Neighbors described Greene as a depressed loner and said that he had been going through several personal hardships, including the death of his father, the departure of his wife, and his separation from his children. At the time of the shootings, he was living with his mother and daughter in the former's house, located near Urbandale High School.

=== Earlier incidents ===
Greene reportedly had a history of assault and confrontations with police. In April 2014, he was charged with interference with official acts after becoming aggressive and resisting an Urbandale officer's attempt to pat him down in search of weapons. Two days after this incident, he was charged with harassment after he reportedly threatened to kill a man and used a racial slur against him. Greene pleaded guilty in both cases, and was subsequently fined, given a year of probation and a restraining order against the man he threatened, and forced to undergo a psychiatric evaluation. Greene's probation officer wrote that Greene had complied with the terms of his probation, as well as medication recommendations.

Two weeks prior to the shootings, he had to be physically escorted by police out of Urbandale High School, where his daughter was a student. The incident occurred during a football game, when he waved a Confederate flag in front of black students during the national anthem, with the apparent intent to incite them into a physical confrontation with him. Some of the fans in the stands were participating in a non-violent protest by sitting during the national anthem. Nearby parents tried to ask Greene to leave, but he refused and continued waving the flag, prompting one parent to grab the flag and throw it onto the track. Officers intervened and tried to ask Greene to leave, but he again refused, arguing that his constitutional rights were being violated. He also tried to report the theft of the flag, as well as an assault on him during the game, but the reports were disregarded. Afterwards, he was temporarily banned from the school grounds until March 2017.

Greene recorded the incident and posted the video on social media. In the video, a person identifying himself as Greene said that he was angry with people, especially blacks, sitting during the national anthem. He also sent an alarming email to school officials, in which he warned that "[they] messed with the wrong guy", that his civil rights were violated, and threatened legal action against the school. In addition, he stalked one of the involved black parents a week later after another game. Greene's behavior prompted school officials to consider increasing security at school events.

Despite the aforementioned encounters, Greene's daughters described their father as having no anti-police ideology and expressed their shock at the shootings. In fact, Greene was reportedly disturbed with the anti-police violence that he felt was being shown by the black community. On October 29, four days before the shootings, he sent a note to the Urbandale Police Department in which he praised its officers for keeping the community safe, called them "absolute heroes", and apologized for his previous run-ins with law enforcement. In the same letter, he claimed he was getting treatment for posttraumatic stress disorder.

Around the same time as the football game incident, Greene had an argument with his mother, Patricia Greene, over a pit bull that was his daughter's service dog, which he brought home, and attempted to kick her out of the house by filing a restraining order and charging her with domestic assault. Patricia, in turn, filed a restraining order of her own to get him out of the house. On the day before the shootings, Patricia's restraining order, which ordered Greene to move out of the house and stay away from her for a year, was accepted and issued to Greene, who also had to return $10,000 to his mother. The domestic assault charge against Patricia Greene was dropped on November 3 due to insufficient evidence.

=== Legal proceedings ===
Following his release from the hospital on November 3, Greene was charged with two counts of first-degree murder. He faced a sentence of life imprisonment without the possibility of parole, the maximum allowed under Iowa law. He was held in the Polk County Jail, initially without bond; he was taken there in handcuffs belonging to the slain officers. Greene made his first court appearance on November 4, where his bond was set at $10 million. His next court appearance was scheduled on November 14, but Greene reportedly waived this hearing on November 9, and it was postponed to November 19.

On May 20, 2017, Greene withdrew his not-guilty plea and pleaded guilty to two counts of first degree murder. That same day, Greene was sentenced to life in prison without the possibility of parole.

== Aftermath ==
The first shooting occurred on an intersection near Urbandale High School, resulting in the Urbandale Community School District canceling all classes and closing its facilities for the day. Classes resumed on the following day. The shootings also prompted the Des Moines Police Department to pair up its patrol officers for their own safety. Makeshift memorials were set up near the crime scenes.

The funeral for Sergeant Anthony Beminio was held on November 7 at West Des Moines. The funeral for Officer Justin Martin was held on November 8 at his hometown of Rockwell City. On November 4, Urbandale hosted a vigil for Martin and Beminio, which was attended by over 2,500 people. This was followed by another vigil at the Des Moines Police Department station the next day, which was attended by more than 500 people.

=== Investigation ===
Between fifteen and thirty .223-caliber rounds were believed to have been fired at the Urbandale crime scene, while Beminio was believed to have been killed while responding to Martin's shooting. Investigators believed both officers were caught by surprise and did not interact with the gunman before being shot. The suspect's car and a high-powered rifle were recovered from a highly remote wooded area during a search by the ATF. The rifle was said to have been so well hidden that no human would have discovered the weapon; the weapon was in fact first discovered by a search dog. The suspect was believed to have used the firearm to shoot Martin and Beminio.

Officers from the Des Moines, Urbandale, Ames, and Iowa State University Police Departments were involved in the investigation and manhunt.

=== Reactions ===
President Barack Obama praised Officer Justin Martin and Sergeant Anthony Beminio, and their dedication to their jobs as police officers. He also condemned the shootings, calling them "shameful acts of violence". Iowa Governor Terry Branstad and Lieutenant Governor Kim Reynolds released a joint statement in which they condemned the shootings and urged Iowa citizens to support law enforcement and the investigation. Attorney General Loretta Lynch condemned the shootings, saying that "violence has no place in the United States of America", and referenced the distrust between law enforcement and several communities nationwide.

On November 4, two days after the shootings, Governor Branstad ordered U.S. and state flags to be lowered at half-mast in honor of the victims from early November 7 to late November 8.

== See also ==
- Gun violence in the United States
- List of American police officers killed in the line of duty
- Shooting of Benjamin Marconi
