= List of law enforcement agencies in Iowa =

This is a list of law enforcement agencies in the state of Iowa.

According to the US Bureau of Justice Statistics' 2008 Census of State and Local Law Enforcement Agencies, the state had 392 law enforcement agencies employing 5,830 sworn police officers, about 195 for each 100,000 residents.

== Federal Agencies ==
- Office of the United States Marshal for the Northern District of Iowa
- Office of the United States Marshal for the Southern District of Iowa
- Department of Veterans Affairs

== State Agencies ==
- Iowa Department of Corrections
  - Division of Parole
- Iowa Department of Natural Resources Enforcement
- Iowa Department of Public Safety
  - Iowa Division of Criminal Investigation
  - Iowa State Division of Narcotics Enforcement
  - Iowa State Fire Marshal
  - Iowa State Patrol

State Fair Police Department

== County Agencies ==
- Adair County Sheriff's Office
- Adams County Sheriff's Office
- Allamakee County Sheriff's Office
- Appanoose County Sheriff's Office
- Audubon County Sheriff's Office
- Benton County Sheriff's Office
- Black Hawk County Sheriff's Office
- Boone County Sheriff's Office
- Bremer County Sheriff's Office
- Buchanan County Sheriff's Office
- Buena Vista County Sheriff's Office
- Butler County Sheriff's Office
- Calhoun County Sheriff's Office
- Carroll County Sheriff's Office
- Cass County Sheriff's Office
- Cedar County Sheriff's Office
- Cerro Gordo County Sheriff's Office
- Cherokee County Sheriff's Office
- Chickasaw County Sheriff's Office
- Clarke County Sheriff's Office
- Clay County Sheriff's Office
- Clayton County Sheriff's Office
- Clinton County Sheriff's Office
- Crawford County Conservation Board
- Crawford County Sheriff's Office
- Dallas County Sheriff's Office
- Davis County Sheriff's Office
- Decatur County Sheriff's Office
- Delaware County Sheriff's Office
- Des Moines County Sheriff's Office
- Dickinson County Sheriff's Office
- Dubuque County Sheriff's Office
- Emmet County Sheriff's Office
- Fayette County Sheriff's Office
- Floyd County Sheriff's Office
- Franklin County Sheriff's Office
- Fremont County Sheriff's Office
- Greene County Sheriff's Office
- Grundy County Sheriff's Office
- Guthrie County Sheriff's Office
- Hamilton County Sheriff's Office
- Hancock County Sheriff's Office
- Hardin County Sheriff's Office
- Harrison County Conservation Board
- Harrison County Sheriff's Office
- Henry County Sheriff's Office
- Howard County Sheriff's Office
- Humboldt County Sheriff's Office
- Ida County Sheriff's Office
- Iowa County Sheriff's Office
- Jackson County Sheriff's Office
- Jasper County Sheriff's Office
- Jefferson County Sheriff's Office
- Johnson County Sheriff's Office
- Jones County Sheriff's Office
- Keokuk County Sheriff's Office
- Kossuth County Sheriff's Office
- Lee County Sheriff's Office
- Linn County Conservation Board
- Linn County Sheriff's Office
- Louisa County Sheriff's Office
- Lucas County Sheriff's Office
- Lyon County Sheriff's Office
- Madison County Sheriff's Office
- Mahaska County Sheriff's Office
- Marion County Sheriff's Office
- Marshall County Sheriff's Office
- Mills County Sheriff's Office
- Mitchell County Sheriff's Office
- Monona County Conservation Board
- Monona County Sheriff's Office
- Monroe County Sheriff's Office
- Montgomery County Sheriff's Office
- Muscatine County Sheriff's Office
- O'Brien County Conservation Board
- O'Brien County Sheriff's Office
- Osceola County Sheriff's Office
- Page County Sheriff's Office
- Palo Alto County Sheriff's Office
- Plymouth County Conservation Board
- Plymouth County Sheriff's Office
- Pocohontas County Sheriff's Office
- Polk County Conservation Board
- Polk County Sheriff's Office
- Pottawattamie County Conservation Board
- Pottawattamie County Sheriff's Office
- Poweshiek County Sheriff's Office
- Ringgold County Sheriff's Office
- Sac County Sheriff's Office
- Scott County Conservation Board
- Scott County Sheriff's Office
- Shelby County Conservation Board
- Shelby County Sheriff's Office
- Sioux County Conservation Board
- Sioux County Sheriff's Office
- Story County Conservation Board
- Story County Sheriff's Office
- Tama County Sheriff's Office
- Taylor County Sheriff's Office
- Union County Sheriff's Office
- Van Buren County Sheriff's Office
- Wapello County Sheriff's Office
- Warren County Sheriff's Office
- Washington County Sheriff's Office
- Wayne County Sheriff's Office
- Webster County Sheriff's Office
- Winnebago County Sheriff's Office
- Winneshiek County Sheriff's Office
- Woodbury County Conservation Board
- Woodbury County Sheriff's Office
- Worth County Sheriff's Office
- Wright County Sheriff's Office

== Municipal agencies ==
- Ackley Police Department
- Afton Police Department
- Algona Police Department
- Altoona Police Department
- Ames Police Department
- Anamosa Police Department
- Ankeny Police Department
- Armstrong Police Department
- Arnolds Park Police Department
- Asbury Police Department
- Atlantic Police Department
- Audubon Police Department
- Aurelia Police Department
- Belle Plaine Police Department
- Bettendorf Police Department
- Blue Grass Police Department
- Boone Police Department
- Britt Police Department
- Burlington Police Department
- Camanche Police Department
- Carroll Police Department
- Cedar Falls Police Department
- Cedar Rapids Police Department
- Centerville Police Department
- Clarinda Police Department
- Clinton Police Department
- Clive Police Department
- Coralville Police Department
- Council Bluffs Police Department
- Cresco Police Department
- Davenport Police Department
- Desoto Police Department
- Des Moines Police Department
- Dubuque Police Department
- Durant Police Department
- Dysart Police Department
- Dunkerton Police Department
- Eldridge Police Department
- Estherville Police Department
- Fairbank Police Department
- Fairfield Police Department
- Farley Police Department
- Farnhamville Police Department
- Fayette Police Department
- Forest City Police Department
- Fort Dodge Police Department
- Fort Madison Police Department
- Garner Police Department
- Grinnell Police Department
- Hiawatha Police Department
- Iowa City Police Department
- Jefferson Police Department
- Jesup Police Department
- Keokuk Police Department
- Knoxville Police Department
- Le Mars Police Department
- Lisbon Police Department
- Maquoketa Police Department
- Marion Police Department
- Marshalltown Police Department
- Mason City Police Department
- Monona Police Department
- Mitchellville Police Department
- Monticello Police Department
- Mount Pleasant Police Department
- Mount Vernon Police Department
- Muscatine Police Department
- New Hampton Police Department
- New London Police Department
- New Sharon Police Department
- Newton Police Department
- North Liberty Police Department
- Norwalk Police Department
- Oelwein Police Department
- Ogden Police Department
- Okoboji Police Department
- Osage Police Department
- Osceola Police Department
- Ottumwa Police Department
- Pella Police Department
- Perry Police Department
- Pleasant Hill Police Department
- Prairie City Police Department
- Princeton Police Department
- Red Oak Police Department
- Robins Police Department
- Rock Valley Police Department
- Shellsburg Police Department
- Shenandoah Police Department
- Sioux City Police Department
- Spencer Police Department
- Spirit Lake Police Department
- State Center Police Department
- Storm Lake Police Department
- Story City Police Department
- Tama Police Department
- Tipton Police Department
- Toledo Police Department
- University Heights Police Department
- Urbana Police Department
- Urbandale Police Department
- Van Meter Police Department
- Vinton Police Department
- Washington Police Department
- Waterloo Police Department
- Waverly Police Department
- Webster City Police Department
- West Burlington Police Department
- West Des Moines Police Department
- West Liberty Police Department
- West Union Police Department
- Wilton Police Department
- Windsor Heights Police Department
- Winterset Police Department

== College and University agencies ==
- Iowa State University Police Department
- University of Iowa Police Department
- University of Northern Iowa Police Department

== Other agencies ==
- Meskwaki Nation Police Department
- Eastern Iowa Airport Public Safety Department

== Disbanded/Defunct agencies ==
- Iowa Department of Transportation Motor Vehicle Enforcement
- Center Point Police Department
- Coggon Police Department
- Iowa Capitol Police/District 16
- Palo Police Department
- Springville Police Department

== Notes of Interest ==
All Iowa Sheriff's Departments use the same markings and graphics on their patrol vehicles aside from each county having its respective name on the patrol vehicle before the word "County" under the "SHERIFF" door markings. All road deputies in the state also wear the same khaki and green uniforms. All counties have the same shoulder patches with the county name at the top, a 7 point gold star with "IOWA" in the middle, and "SHERIFF" at the bottom. Polk County Deputies may sometimes be seen with Silver 7-point stars on their uniforms. Many years ago they were sent the wrong color patches due to a shipping or order mistake and haven't bothered to fix the 'tradition' in the years since.
