= Charles Brown and Charles Kelley =

Executed American spree killers

Charles Noel Brown
- Brown at the time of his arrest
- Born: June 21, 1933; Bedford, Indiana, U.S.
- Died: July 24, 1962 (aged 29); Iowa State Penitentiary, Iowa, U.S.
- Other name: The Mad Dog Killers
- Spouse: Mary Lou Goldsby Brown (m. 1948)
- Children: 5
- Status: Executed by hanging
- Motive: Robbery; Witness elimination
- Conviction: First degree murder
- Penalty: Death

Details
- Date: February 18–22, 1961
- Country: United States
- States: Minnesota and Iowa
- Killed: 4 (one died from complications in 2007)
- Injured: 2
- Weapon: Revolver
- Date apprehended: February 23, 1961

Charles Edwin Kelley
- Kelley at the time of his arrest
- Born: February 17, 1941; Hennepin County, Minnesota, U.S.
- Died: September 6, 1962 (aged 21); Iowa State Penitentiary, Iowa, U.S.
- Other name: The Mad Dog Killers
- Status: Executed by hanging
- Motive: Robbery; Witness elimination
- Conviction: First degree murder
- Penalty: Death

Details
- Date: February 18–22, 1961
- Country: United States
- States: Minnesota and Iowa
- Killed: 4 (one died from complications in 2007)
- Injured: 2
- Weapon: Revolver
- Date apprehended: February 23, 1961

Charles Noel Brown (June 21, 1933 – July 24, 1962) and Charles Edwin Kelley (February 17, 1941 – September 6, 1962) were American spree killers who killed three people and wounded three others in a five-day, three-state rampage in February 1961. The duo, who shot their victims to avoid leaving witnesses, were labeled the "Mad Dog Killers". Sentenced to death for a murder committed in Iowa, Brown and Kelley became the last people to be executed in the state. Iowa abolished capital punishment in 1965.

== Early lives ==
According to Brown's mother, sister, and uncle, he had a rough life and dropped out of school after 8th grade to help his family. His father was a frequently absent alcoholic.

In 1956, Kelley was diagnosed with epilepsy after becoming dizzy and falling down. During his murder trial, he testified that he stopped taking medication after about a year. When he was 17, Kelley volunteered for the Marines with his father's permission, but was discharged 17 days later after suffering from a grand mal seizure.

== Murders ==
Brown, an ex-con who had served prison time for forgery, met Kelley as they were working together as parking lot attendants. The two soon became drinking buddies. After Kelley robbed a gas station armed with a screwdriver, Brown used the money to buy two handguns. He later said that this "was a stupid thing to do – I can give no reason for it."

On February 18, 1961, Brown and Kelley robbed a gas station in Minnesota. They shot the attendant, 17-year-old James Peterson, three times. Two of the shots hit Peterson in the head, and the third likely would've hit him in the heart, but was deflected by a button on his work uniform. He went into a coma, emerged from it a few days later long enough to talk to police, and then went into unconsciousness once more. He would remain in critical condition for over a month, but survived. Peterson died from complications from his injuries in 2007.

On February 20, Brown and Kelley shot and killed 52-year-old Howard Trowbridge while robbing a tavern in Minneapolis. They also shot 30-year-old bartender George Koch six times, albeit Koch survived his injuries. They then took a bus to Nebraska. Kelley said he shot the men since "I thought they might identify us." Afterwards, the two men and Josephine Patricia Nesbit, a 28-year-old woman whom Brown had been living with for the past three or four months, took a taxi from Minneapolis to Saint Paul, where they then boarded a bus for Omaha, Nebraska. The two left Nesbit in a tavern with instructions to wait until they got a car and returned.

That night, Brown and Kelley shot and killed 60-year-old Harry Goldberg during a liquor store robbery in Omaha. Kelley later told the police that, "We got some cash and also a bottle of whiskey. I took this old man into the rear room and told him to turn around. He didn't do as I asked, so I shot him with my gun." Brown said, "I shot this old man so he wouldn't tell the police anything." The two then took a taxi to Council Bluffs, Iowa, where they planned to steal a car and make their getaway. Brown and Kelley carjacked 54-year-old Alvin Koehrsen and ordered him to drive at gunpoint. After driving several blocks, they had him pull over. The two then shot Koehrsen seven times and dumped him onto the street. Koehrsen died from his injuries two days later.

After failing to turn the car back on, Brown and Kelley were forced to move on foot. About 20 minutes later, they went to a parking lot, where they saw Kenneth Vencel was getting into his car. When they threatened him, he ran away. The two men shot Vencel three times, once in the stomach and twice in the back, albeit survived his injuries. They then drove back to Omaha, picked up Nesbit, and started traveling north. However, they only drove about 25 miles before the car broke down in Missouri Valley. Brown, Kelley, and Nesbit bought bus tickets there for Kansas City, Missouri. They boarded the bus at 11:00 that night.

However, the trio drew the suspicion of a ticket manager, who contacted the police. Twenty minutes later, the bus stopped at a police roadblock near the north edge of Council Bluffs. All three of them were arrested, albeit Nesbit was released after it was determined that she had not been involved in any of the murders. Brown and Kelley both tried to take the blame for the other. When talking about why they had shot Vencel, who had been running away, Kelley said the shootings were done to eliminate witnesses.

"I don't think he gave us any trouble at all, but I figured that if he wasn't shot, he could identify us and tell police so, I started to shoot at him."

Brown said the same:

"This man got out of the car and tried to run. I knew that I had to shoot this man also as he was trying to get to a place and call help. I fired several shots at this man, both while facing us and while in the act of running away."

Brown said he had "nothing left to lose," having reached the point that he no longer cared about anything. He told the police that he wanted to remain in Iowa. At the time, Iowa still had capital punishment and Brown wanted to be executed: "I want to die for what I did. I don't want to spend the rest of my life in jail." He also told the police that were it not for Nesbit being present, he would've never been taken alive.

"If it weren't for the woman, you would never have gotten me handcuffed."

When Kelley was asked why he didn't fire, he replied, "Have you ever looked down the barrel of a gun?" The police also asked, "How can you shoot people like that?"

"It was easy, they had no guns."

== Trials and executions ==
Kelley and Brown were charged with first degree murder and armed robbery for killing Koehrsen in Iowa. Prosecutors said they would seek a death sentence for both of them. Pottawattamie County attorney Peter J. Peters declared that, "If there ever was a case that justified the death penalty this certainly is one— and so is the Kelley case."

Brown was tried first. He did not contest his guilt and was quickly found guilty. Several of his family members testified during the sentencing phase. On the stand, Brown said he had a drinking problem, had started drinking when he was around 10 or 11, and was drinking heavily during his crime spree.

During their deliberations, the jury asked the judge if Brown would have a chance of parole if he was given a life sentence, and how many years he would have to serve in prison if that was the case (all life sentences are without parole in Iowa, and a lifer's only chance of freedom is if the governor commutes their sentence to make them eligible for release). The judge said "You have a right to assume any verdict returned by you will be faithfully carried out. Should you desire to make any recommendations after you have agreed upon your verdict you may write them on paper and return it with your verdict." Hearing this, Brown's uncle, Paul Day, became hopeful that his nephew might be spared execution. However, less than two hours later, after nearly 14 hours of deliberation, the jury came out with a recommendation for a death sentence. In response, Brown said "I knew this was coming. I don't care. The only thing I feel bad about is my folks."

Kelley's lawyers initially planned for an insanity defense, but that was thrown out. He was convicted of both charges. Kelley presented a much stronger defense than Brown during the sentencing phase, with his defense emphasizing his epilepsy. A psychiatrist who examined Kelley said he had a "sociopathic personality", and found no evidence of a "psychotic reaction which would indicate that Mr. Kelley is not responsible for his acts." Another mitigating factor mentioned was Kelley's youth. At the age of 20, he would be one of the youngest people executed in Iowa.

After deliberating for 48 hours, the jury deadlocked, resulting in a mistrial and leaving Kelley's fate up to Judge Leroy H. Johnson. The jury foreman, Sam Garnett, said all of the jurors knew Kelley was guilty, but that he and another juror wanted a life sentence. "I couldn't ask for hanging when there were small doubts in my mind whether the killing was premeditated, whether Kelley altogether was a mentally sound person, and how much influence the older man (Brown) had on him.”

Hoping for leniency, Kelley pleaded guilty rather than face a retrial. At his sentencing hearing, his attorney, Robert C. Heithoff, presented additional evidence of his client possibly having a history of epilepsy. He told Johnson that "the easy thing and perhaps the popular thing is to hang Kelley. Many people would applaud you. Some would rejoice. But later, after consideration and thought, people would not gain in any acclaim of death. All life is worth saving, and mercy is the highest attitude of man." Johnson announced that he would need two weeks to reach his decision, which was considered an unusually long amount of time. On June 7, 1961, Johnson sentenced Kelley to death.

The appeals of both men were unsuccessful and Governor Norman A. Erbe declined to grant clemency. In an interview in August 1961, Kelley was resigned to his upcoming execution: "I have to pay for it, that's all there is to it. They felt I deserved this and gave it to me." He said he was remorseful, but conceded, "It's too late to be sorry." Brown and Kelley were both executed at the Iowa State Penitentiary in Fort Madison. Brown was hanged on July 24, 1962, becoming the first man executed in Iowa since 1952. As he walked to the gallows, he said he hoped that "the people will forgive me for what I've done." Brown's last words immediately before dropping through the trapdoor were "God forgive me." He was pronounced dead at 5:05 a.m. CST.

Kelley was hanged on September 6, 1962. His last meal consisted of steak, potatoes, salad, blueberry pie, and ice cream. His last words were "I'm sorry what I did." Kelley was pronounced dead at 5:46 a.m. CST. His last request was for the prison chaplain, Lester Peter, to read the 23rd Psalm. At 21, Kelley became both the second youngest and last person to be executed in Iowa. Among the witnesses to his executions was Vencel, who still had a bullet lodged near his spine. "I'm pretty happy to be here today," he said. "He's got it coming to him. At least they got a trial. The other fellows shot by Kelley and Brown didn't get one."

In an interview in 1995, Norman Erbe said he did not believe capital punishment was much of a deterrent and that his feelings on it were complex. However, he also stated that he never regretted denying clemency for Brown and Kelley, given the severity of the crimes and the overwhelming evidence of guilt.

"Not at all. I didn't then. I haven't since. I don't now."

Another man, Victor Feguer, was executed in 1963, but he was hanged for a federal conviction.

In 1965, the Iowa General Assembly passed a law that abolished capital punishment; it was signed into law by Governor Harold Hughes. Although there have been a number of attempts to reinstate the death penalty in Iowa, none have been successful. Since Kelley's executions, prisoners of the United States federal government have been executed in Iowa but no one has been executed under Iowa law.

== See also ==
- Capital punishment in Iowa
- Capital punishment in the United States
- List of most recent executions by jurisdiction
- List of people executed in Iowa
- List of people executed in the United States in 1962
