= Warren John Nutter =

Longest-serving inmate in Iowa history (1937–2021)

Warren John Nutter Jr.
- Mug shot of Nutter in 1956
- Born: Warren John Nutter III; June 30, 1937; Freeport, Illinois, U.S.
- Died: December 8, 2021 (aged 84); Fort Madison, Iowa, U.S.
- Other name: Jack Nutter
- Known for: Longest-serving prisoner in Iowa history (65 years, 9 months, and 28 days)
- Conviction: First-degree murder
- Penalty: Death by hanging (later commuted to life imprisonment with the possibility of parole)

Details
- Date: January 5, 1956; 70 years ago
- Country: United States
- State: Iowa
- Location: Buchanan County Courthouse

Warren John "Jack" Nutter Jr. (christened Warren John Nutter III; June 30, 1937 – December 8, 2021) was an American convicted murderer who was the longest-serving inmate in Iowa history.

Originally sentenced to hang for killing a police officer in 1956 at age 18, Nutter's sentence was commuted in 1957 to life imprisonment with the possibility of parole. Nutter went on to serve 65 years, 9 months, and 28 days within the Iowa penal system, ultimately dying in custody at the Iowa State Penitentiary in 2021 at the age of 84.

== Early life ==
Nutter was born on June 30, 1937, in Freeport, Illinois, to Warren John Nutter Sr. (1915–2004) and his wife Edith Nutter (née Aumock; 1916–1994), who had married in 1936. He was an only child. His parents endured "two or three" periods of separation before ultimately divorcing in 1949, when he was 11 years old. His father subsequently relocated to California, while his mother remained in Freeport and remarried Roman Schoop (1916–1959), becoming Edith Schoop.

Nutter began having run-ins with the law at a young age. By age 12, he had started smoking and was getting into trouble for staying out late and breaking street lamps. He later explained that he funded his activities with a crowd of local youths by committing a series of petty break-ins. Court records show his early offenses escalated to include stealing from churches, cashing bad checks, setting fire to a landlord's coal bin, stealing mail, and car theft.

At age 14, Nutter was sent to the Illinois State Training School for Boys in St. Charles, Illinois, for forging checks. After serving seven months, he was arrested for violating his parole when he stole a car and ran away with a girl. This violation resulted in his commitment to a reformatory in Sheridan, Illinois. By early 1956, the 18-year-old was living with his mother and stepfather in Freeport while on parole from the facility.

== Murder of Officer Harold Pearce ==
On January 4, 1956, around 1:00 p.m., Nutter—18 years old at the time—obtained a 1954 model car from Myers Ford Sales Co. in Freeport, Illinois, under the pretense of a test drive. When he failed to return the vehicle, Police Magistrate William Kintzel issued a state warrant charging Nutter with driving a car without the owner's consent, which remained his sole charge in Freeport. Nutter later stated his motive was to escape his stepfather and drive to California to locate his biological father, whom he had not seen since September 1951.

According to a reconstruction of the events, Nutter drove to Rockford, Illinois, after taking the car. While there, he asked his parole officer for money but was turned down. He then picked up Robert Wright (16) of Rockford and David Jenkins (17) of Forreston, Illinois. Nutter's accounts of his relationship with the boys varied; he was quoted in one interview describing them as "two fellows I knew," though he later claimed he had not known them prior to the trip. Wright, who was reportedly on probation in Winnebago County, sold the car's spare tire and wheel to secure gas money for their projected trip to California, which they planned to finance further by committing crimes along the way. The teenagers later told investigators they departed Rockford at 2:00 p.m. that afternoon. Later that evening, the group returned to Freeport to pick up two girls they knew: Joan Saur (16) of Rockford and Betty Zwiefel (16) of Freeport. Police later reported that the group had also attempted to recruit a third girl, identified by officers as Nutter's girlfriend, to join them on the trip to California, but she refused. Reports noted that all five teenagers came from broken homes, had difficult relationships with their parents, and had prior police records.

Without informing the girls that their destination was California, Nutter deceived them by telling them to grab a pair of skates and come along for an ice skating trip. The group departed Freeport between 9:00 and 10:00 p.m. They initially stopped at a farm home near Freeport with the intention of robbing it, but they were scared off when the female occupant appeared at the door. Proceeding west along U.S. Route 20 into Iowa, the teenagers burglarized a local gas station in Earlville, Iowa, at about midnight to steal cash, gasoline, candy, a flashlight, and a box of shotgun shells. Nutter maintained that Wright and Jenkins committed the burglary while he stayed outside. However, Jenkins and Wright contradicted this claim, stating that Nutter accompanied them in the break-in while the girls remained in the car.

Undated photo of Pearce

At approximately 2:00 a.m. on January 5, Officer Harold Pearce (52), who had been with the department for about two years, and Patrolman Henry Funk (59) were traveling east on U.S. Route 20 through Independence, Iowa, when they observed the group's westbound car weaving and traveling at approximately 75 mph (121 km/h). Suspecting a drunk driver, the officers turned their patrol car to give chase, pursuing the vehicle for 8 miles (13 km). The chase reached speeds of up to 100 mph (161 km/h) and ended near the west edge of Jesup, Iowa, when Nutter, who was driving the fleeing vehicle, failed to make a turn into the city and drove straight onto a gravel road. The teenagers got out without any resistance and were searched. Pearce returned the three boys to Independence in the squad car, and Funk took the girls in the youths' car, transporting them to the sheriff's office located inside the Buchanan County Courthouse in Independence for questioning.

The girls remained in the front office with Pearce while the boys were held in a rear office with Funk. Nutter requested permission to use the restroom, which Funk granted. Once inside, Nutter escaped by squeezing through a narrow, partly open washroom window, dropping approximately 7.5 feet (2.3 m) to the ground outside the courthouse. He then retrieved a 12-gauge shotgun and ammunition from under the back seat of the stolen vehicle, which was parked outside. The weapon had been taken from Wright's father and was originally intended for use in the aborted farmhouse robbery. Nutter later stated he retrieved it for the purpose of freeing his companions.

At around 2:30 a.m., after loading the shotgun in the courthouse hallway, Nutter reentered the sheriff's office where the girls were, cocking the weapon as he entered. He placed the shotgun on a counter facing Pearce, who was seated at a desk with his back toward Nutter. Nutter demanded, "Take out your gun with your left hand and lay it on the table." According to witness testimony, Pearce obeyed the command. The officer arose and approached the counter with his service revolver drawn in his left hand to comply. As he moved forward, Nutter, who later claimed he was scared by the approaching officer, pulled the trigger. The blast struck Pearce in the left side of his chest, killing him instantly. Pearce was survived by his wife, Pearl, and their two daughters, Ivadele Cutshall and Barbara McInteer.

Following the shooting, the girls fled the scene while Nutter attempted to reload the shotgun, but the weapon jammed. Hearing the gunshot, Funk opened the door of the rear office just a crack to investigate. Nutter pointed the shotgun at Funk and ordered him to throw down his weapon. Nutter also shouted to the other two boys to "grab his gun and come with me," prompting them to lunge at Funk. Funk stepped back into the rear room, slammed the door shut on Nutter, and turned on the advancing teenagers with his own gun drawn. Funk warned them, "stay back or you'll die," effectively subduing them. The boys complied, and Funk handcuffed them together before telephoning for help.

Meanwhile, Nutter went to the body of Pearce and retrieved the fallen revolver from under the officer's arm. He threw the jammed shotgun down a courthouse stairwell and fled the building. The two girls hid for a time at a nearby gas station washroom before walking to a city park, where they were recaptured by authorities a short time later. Nutter's escape prompted a massive four-hour manhunt involving about 40 to 50 officers from Buchanan County, the Iowa Highway Patrol, and neighboring jurisdictions. The foot-by-foot search included roadblocks on every highway in the area, and authorities were even considering deploying an airplane to assist.

At around 6:00 a.m., Independence Police Officer Ray Moline stopped a Gateway trucking firm driver, Leo Bowers, who reported seeing a man attempting to hitch a ride south of the city. Three cars of officers converged on the location. At approximately 6:45 a.m., Nutter was apprehended without resistance while hitchhiking along Iowa Highway 150, 3.5 miles (5.6 km) south of Independence. Winneshiek County Deputy Sheriff Robert Hitesman stepped from the lead car and took Nutter into custody. At the time of his arrest, Pearce's revolver was found inside Nutter's right pocket.

== Legal proceedings ==
=== Plea and sentencing ===
On January 6, 1956, Nutter waived his preliminary hearing when he was arraigned on a charge of first-degree murder and held without bond. That same day, he signed a statement confessing to the killing of Pearce. Describing the split-second reaction, Nutter stated, "No, I wasn't mad at him. I didn't even know him. He drew his gun and I fired. I don't know what I was thinking about." He was formally charged on January 9 and initially pleaded not guilty on January 19. However, on February 3, Nutter and his defense attorney withdrew the not guilty plea and entered a plea of guilty to the charge of murder.

On February 7, during a hearing in open court, Nutter confirmed to Judge Shannon Charlton that he understood the consequences of his guilty plea, waived his right to a jury trial, and offered no defense. The court continued the hearing through February 8 to examine witnesses and determine the degree of the offense. If a lesser degree of murder was decided, the penalty could have been set as low as 10 years in prison. The State presented eleven witnesses, while the defense presented three, including Nutter himself, and entered a lengthy handwritten confession into evidence.

Taking the stand on February 7, Nutter described his actions and mindset during the fatal encounter. When questioned about his intention for bringing the shotgun into the office, Nutter replied, "To get the girls and boys out." He stated that he loaded the weapon in the courthouse hallway before the confrontation. Nutter claimed he ordered the officer to "Take out your gun with your left hand and lay it on the table," but the officer instead drew his weapon with his right hand and advanced toward him. "Before I could speak again, the patrolman was in front of me pointing his gun," Nutter testified. When asked by his defense attorney if he had any intention of shooting prior to that moment, Nutter answered, "No." He ultimately concluded his narrative by admitting, "I got scared and pulled the trigger." However, eyewitness testimony from Saur and Zwiefel contradicted his account, stating that Pearce had complied with the demand to remove his revolver with his left hand and was simply moving toward the counter when Nutter fired.

Following the proceedings, Judge Charlton ruled the crime to be murder in the first degree. Charlton had the decision to choose between life imprisonment or death. On February 10, 1956, he gave the youth the maximum penalty, sentencing Nutter to be hanged, with his execution date scheduled for February 18, 1957.

=== Sentencing of accomplices ===
Wright and Jenkins were transferred to a jail in Manchester, Iowa, to face trial for burglary and larceny of a gas station. On January 19, 1956, they escaped by breaking through the roof of the jail building and fleeing in a stolen county car. They were recaptured the following day at Wright's home in Rockford. On January 21, the two youths pleaded guilty and were each sentenced to 11 years in the men's reformatory in Anamosa, Iowa, for burglary, jailbreaking, and stealing a county car.

Following the killing, Zwiefel and Saur were initially held in the Independence jail as material witnesses. Both girls later testified at a hearing to determine the degree of Nutter's guilt. Following their testimony, they were committed to the Geneva State Training School for Girls in Illinois. Zwiefel was turned over to the Illinois Youth Commission by a county judge in Freeport, while Saur was committed as a delinquent by a juvenile court in Rockford.

=== Appeals and commutation ===
An appeal of the death sentence to the Iowa Supreme Court was filed on Thursday, April 26, 1956, by Nutter's attorney, Joseph Thornton. In his filings to the high court, Thornton argued to have the sentence set aside, contending that the initial information filed against Nutter failed to charge a "willful" act and that there was no evidence of deliberation. Furthermore, Thornton argued that the death penalty was excessive, emphasizing that psychiatrists had diagnosed Nutter with a "mental complex." However, no formal claim was made that Nutter was legally insane in a way that would excuse the act.

The case was officially brought before the Iowa Supreme Court on December 11, 1956. However, the court failed to rule by January 15, 1957, and as a result, Nutter was granted a temporary stay of execution because the state could not proceed with the hanging on the originally scheduled date of February 18. The court indicated that the next date for decisions would be February 5.

On February 5, 1957, the Iowa Supreme Court issued a unanimous ruling upholding Nutter's death sentence. Addressing the defense's legal arguments, the court ruled that Iowa law recognizes only one crime of murder with varying gradations, and that the charging document's use of the phrase "deliberately, with premeditation and malice aforethought" sufficiently established first-degree murder. In rejecting the plea for leniency, the high court characterized the killing of Pearce as a "ruthless and vicious" crime. The justices noted that they acted strictly as a court for the correction of errors and lacked the authority to exercise pardoning power, stating that commutation did not belong to their department of government. Because the court's ruling occurred close to the originally scheduled execution date of February 18, the state moved the date back, as Nutter was granted an automatic 30-day period in which to petition for a rehearing.

Following the court's decision, Nutter released a statement from death row expressing remorse, stating he was "very sorry for the horrible thing I have done." Accepting the ruling, he added, "If the statement the honorable Supreme Court has given is the only understanding they could come to, I can do nothing but go by their word." In a subsequent interview, Nutter revealed he had written to former Governor Leo Hoegh in the fall of 1956 to apologize for the killing, but never received a reply. By mid-February, Nutter's complete case file had been delivered to newly elected Governor Herschel C. Loveless. On February 12, Loveless publicly addressed the case, stating he had studied the matter for months and held a "firm opinion" on his eventual duty. Loveless disclosed that his office had been flooded with letters from across the Midwest, mostly opposing the execution, and noted he was monitoring a bill in the Iowa Legislature seeking to ban capital punishment for minors as a "good yardstick of public feeling." However, because Nutter's 30-day window to petition for a rehearing was still active, Loveless emphasized he lacked jurisdiction to intervene, stating, "there isn't any action I can take at this time."

On March 5, 1957—the deadline of that 30-day window—Thornton formally asked the Iowa Supreme Court for an extension until April 5. The high court granted a partial extension, giving the defense until March 18 to file the petition for a rehearing. If the rehearing was denied, Nutter was expected to formally ask Loveless to commute the death penalty, a plea the governor had already indicated he was seriously considering. The defense successfully filed the request on March 15; consequently, these ongoing court proceedings indefinitely postponed Nutter's originally scheduled February 18 execution.

On April 5, 1957, the Iowa Supreme Court officially reaffirmed Nutter's death sentence, formally exhausting his judicial appeals. The final decision then fell to Loveless, who possessed the authority to either commute the sentence to life imprisonment or set a new execution date.

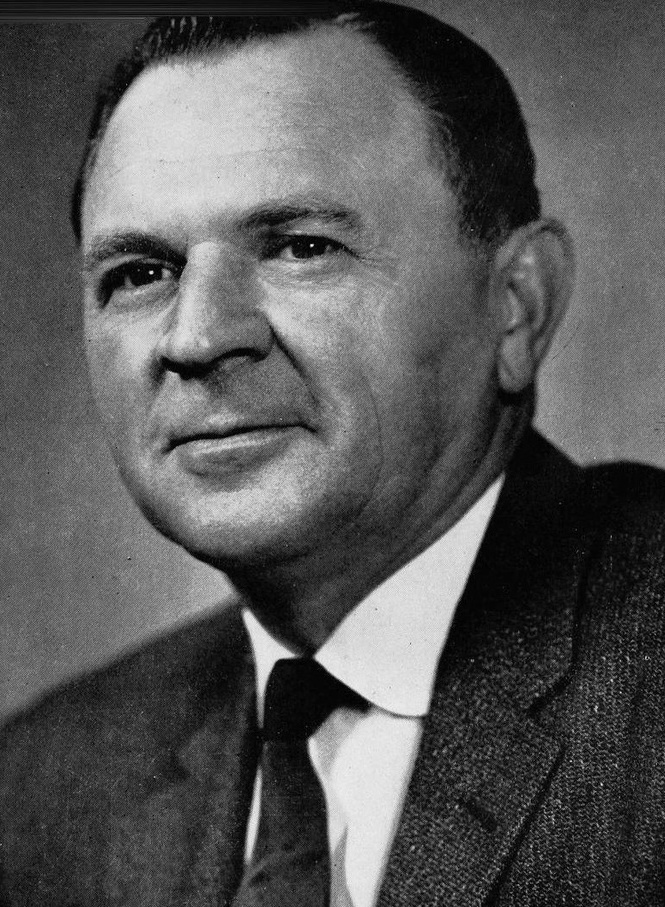
Governor Herschel C. Loveless, who commuted Nutter's death sentence to life imprisonment in 1957.

On April 8, 1957, Loveless announced the commutation of Nutter's sentence to life imprisonment. Although he had reached his decision much earlier, Loveless delayed the public announcement until he received the official Supreme Court order denying a rehearing. In his official statement, Loveless revealed that he had requested transcripts and thoroughly reviewed the case within days of taking office, leading him to pre-draft the commutation papers. Explaining his decision, Loveless cited the boy's youth and difficult family background, stating that "there is a basic responsibility beyond that of the individual." He also noted that a review of state records showed life sentences being imposed for murders involving greater premeditation and brutality. Emphasizing that the commutation did not condone the crime, Loveless stated, "A sentence of life imprisonment for one so young will in some respects constitute a more serious penalty than immediate release through death. The final judgment rests with a much higher authority than myself." Nutter learned of his commutation through a radio broadcast—a detail he later recounted in a 2017 interview—though he did not receive official notification until the following day. Upon being officially transferred off death row, Nutter expressed his gratitude, stating, "I want to thank the governor for what he done for me." When asked if he had a message for anyone else, Nutter simply replied, "I wouldn't know what to say."

== Imprisonment ==
Nutter began his sentence on February 10, 1956, at the Iowa State Penitentiary in Fort Madison, Iowa, where he was the only prisoner on death row. At the time of his sentencing, he was scheduled to be the second-youngest person to be hanged in the state's history. Upon his arrival, a confused Nutter mistakenly believed his execution was imminent. He later recalled, "Either I didn't hear the judge right or else he said the wrong year when he sentenced me to die Feb. 18. I thought it would be eight days after I got here. The chaplain put me right and told me I had a year to go."

In a February 1957 interview with the United Press, Nutter noted that his family visitation had been minimal; his mother visited infrequently, his stepfather refused to enter the prison to see him, and his biological father only contacted him to send a Christmas package. In another interview the same month with The Des Moines Register, Nutter spoke about his remorse, stating, "I've thought about writing to that policeman's widow. If I knew her address I would. Even then, I'm afraid I can't express in words how sorry I am." Reflecting on his situation, he also offered advice to other teenagers: "When you start to do something, think it over twice before you do it. See some older person and talk it over before you do anything on impulse."

Following his commutation in April 1957, Nutter was transferred to the Anamosa State Penitentiary. In September 1958, Nutter met Governor Loveless in person for the first time when Loveless attended an annual banquet at the reformatory; Nutter thanked him for commuting his sentence, and the governor provided him with an autograph. Nutter remained housed at Anamosa until around 1962, at which point he was transferred back to the Iowa State Penitentiary in Fort Madison.

Starting in 1971, Nutter began making appearances before the state parole board. During this period, he was transferred to a minimum-security, "no-bars" prison camp, where he expected to eventually receive parole. However, this prospect was abruptly cut short following a major policy shift in January 1975, when Ronald Wayne Brewer—an inmate serving a life sentence at the Anamosa State Penitentiary—committed a double murder while out on a prison-sponsored furlough. In the aftermath of the tragedy, Iowa correctional authorities returned Nutter and all other lifers in the state system to secure, behind-bars facilities, severely restricting their chances for future commutation.

In a January 1976 interview with The Des Moines Register, Nutter reflected on both the shooting and his subsequent twenty years of incarceration. Recalling the events of 1956, he described the murder as an act of fear rather than a "crime of passion," noting he did not know the officer. "There was a big bang and it was all over," he stated, attributing his actions to panic. Nutter expressed deep regret for not fleeing after initially escaping through the washroom window. He explained his return to the room stemmed from a youthful belief that he needed to help his friends, lamenting, "Why, oh why, did I go back? ... Why did I ever leave home that day?". Nutter confessed that he remained haunted by the incident, occasionally seeing Pearce's face in his dreams, and stated he had written an apology letter to the officer's widow. Discussing his time in the penitentiary, he emphasized his clean disciplinary record, noting he had not been in a single fight and never attempted to escape because he had "too much hard time invested to run out." Despite periods of depression over his lengthy sentence, Nutter maintained gratitude that his execution was commuted, remarking, "Where there's life, there's hope."

After serving nearly three decades with a positive disciplinary record, Nutter had his case submitted to Governor Terry Branstad in 1985 by prison officials and the Iowa Board of Parole, both of whom supported commuting his sentence so he could be paroled. However, Governor Branstad denied the request after reviewing records indicating that Nutter had attempted to reload his weapon to continue firing during the murder. Additional opposition came from Independence Police Chief Daniel Schremsel, who asserted that Nutter should remain imprisoned, while official risk assessments categorized him as a "very poor" violence risk. Criticizing the decision, Nutter told The Des Moines Register, "He's thinking if he lets me out he won't get elected again."

Nutter's final administrative review by the Iowa Board of Parole occurred on June 20, 1995, during which the board declined to recommend his life sentence for commutation. By September 1998, with his avenues for release exhausted, Nutter had become the longest-serving inmate in Iowa history, having spent 42 years in the system. At age 61, he was housed in a cell block designated specifically for "honor" lifers. Reflecting on the physical and psychological toll of his decades of confinement, Nutter remarked, "I came in here when I was 18, and I still feel 18 inside... But I know I'm getting older outside. I go out and walk around the track, play a couple sets of tennis and wake up in the morning and feel like I'm 93 years old." Though he acknowledged that he would likely die in custody, he expressed a sense of community within the walls, stating, "This is like we're in our own little community. Everybody I know is in the penitentiary."

In a June 2006 interview with The Gazette, Nutter reflected on the killing, stating, "I know I killed a police officer. That's the worst crime." He characterized the incident as "not a planned murder" and expressed remorse, adding, "I'm sorry I did it. I can't change that." Regarding his long-term incarceration and personal growth, Nutter remarked, "I know people can change. I know I have changed."

Mug shot of Nutter c. 2015

On August 1, 2015, the inmates of the Iowa State Penitentiary were transferred to a newly constructed, $182 million maximum-security facility. The new prison is located approximately two miles from the original downtown Fort Madison location. The massive relocation operation moved 507 offenders, including Nutter, out of the historic stone prison where he had spent the vast majority of his life sentence.

In a 2015 interview for the documentary The Fort: 177 Years of Crime and Punishment at the Iowa State Penitentiary, directed by Dan Manatt, a 78-year-old Nutter reflected on his decades behind bars. He fondly recalled joining the prison baseball and softball teams, and expressed a deep attachment to the old stone prison, calling it his only home and stating, "I grew up down there." Manatt observed that Nutter was "very much institutionalized," bore little resemblance to the teenager who committed the murder in 1956, and no longer had an active petition for clemency.

Nutter died at the age of 84 on the morning of December 8, 2021, in a hospice room at the Iowa State Penitentiary in Fort Madison, Iowa. He had been housed in the facility's hospice unit due to a chronic illness.

== See also ==
- Capital punishment in Iowa
- Iowa State Penitentiary
- List of longest prison sentences served
