= Des Moines Police Department =

Des Moines Police Department may refer to:

- Des Moines Police Department (Iowa)
- Des Moines Police Department (Washington)
