= Iowa Department of Transportation Motor Vehicle Enforcement Agency =

Law enforcement agency in the US state of Iowa

Iowa Department of Transportation Office of Motor Vehicle Enforcement
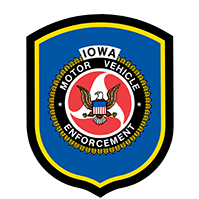
- Iowa Department of Transportation Motor Vehicle Enforcement Logo

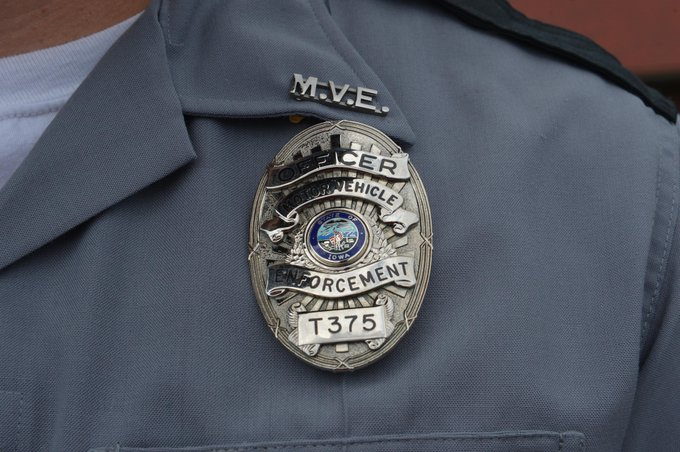
- Iowa Department of Transportation Motor Vehicle Enforcement Badge
- Common name: Motor Vehicle Enforcement
- Abbreviation: MVE

Agency overview
- Formed: 1975
- Preceding agencies: Iowa Highway Commission Traffic Weight Officers; Officers of the Iowa Commerce Commission; Department of Public Safety Motor Vehicle Investigators
- Dissolved: July 1st, 2023
- Superseding agency: Iowa State Patrol

Jurisdictional structure
- Operations jurisdiction: Iowa, United States
- General nature: Civilian police

Operational structure
- Headquarters: Office of Motor Vehicle Enforcement, Ankeny, Iowa
- Sworn members: 94
- Unsworn members: 5
- Agency executive: Ryan Ridout, Chief
- Parent agency: Iowa Department of Transportation

Facilities
- Patrol cars: Chevrolet Tahoe

Website
- Office of Motor Vehicle Enforcement

The Iowa Department of Transportation Motor Vehicle Enforcement was a law enforcement agency located in the state of Iowa. Like the Iowa State Patrol, Motor Vehicle Enforcement (MVE as they are most commonly called) was a statewide agency. Their primary mission and expertise was the enforcement of laws and regulations concerning commercial motor vehicles in the state.

The officers dealt with state and Federal safety regulations, hazardous material regulations, commercial drivers licensing, commercial vehicle registration, oversize vehicles, fuel tax compliance, ensuring drivers were medically certified, and ensuring driver follow log book regulations. The officers were certified law enforcement officers, and can assist with other law enforcement duties as required.

There were 94 sworn peace officers in the agency. Officers with Motor Vehicle Enforcement primarily drove Chevy Tahoe PPV that were white in color.

== History ==
In early 1941 highway engineers expressed concern that overweight commercial vehicles would eventually cause serious damage to Iowa's highway system. Legislation was passed, and signed into law on April 16, 1941 that allowed the highway commission to designate certain employees as peace officers to enforce the laws concerning size and weight. The first officer entered service on July 1 of that year.

In 1975 the Iowa Department of Transportation was formed. As part of the law forming the Iowa DOT, the highway commission officers, officers of the Iowa Commerce Commission, and motor vehicle investigators from the Iowa Department of Public Safety were combined into the modern Iowa DOT Motor Vehicle Enforcement. This new department was placed under the authority of the Iowa DOT.

On July 1, 2023, a new state government organizational structure takes effect. Government departments and agencies that provide related services or have similar business functions are aligning to better serve Iowans.

State Fire Marshal's BUILDING CODE, ELECTRICAL LICENSING & INSPECTION, and FIRE PREVENTION BUREAUS join the Dept. of Inspections, Appeals and Licensing.

The COMMERCIAL MOTOR VEHICLE UNIT joins Iowa State Patrol in DPS - formerly Dept. of Transportation's Motor Vehicle Enforcement.

OFFICE OF DRUG CONTROL POLICY joins DPS.

== See also ==
- List of law enforcement agencies in Iowa
