= San Antonio Police Department =

Municipal police force in the United States

- Abbreviation: SAPD

Agency overview
- Formed: 1846
- Employees: 2,991 (2020)
- Annual budget: $479 m (2020)

Jurisdictional structure
- Operations jurisdiction: San Antonio, Texas, USA
- Map of San Antonio Police Department's jurisdiction
- Area: 465.4 square miles (1,210 km^{2})
- Population: 1,492,510 (2017)
- General nature: Local civilian police

Operational structure
- Headquarters: 315 S. Santa Rosa
- Police officers: 2,352 (2020)
- Unsworn members: 639 (2020)
- Elected officer responsible: Gina Ortiz Jones, Mayor of San Antonio
- Agency executives: Jesus "Jesse" Salame, Chief of Police; Robert Blanton, Assistant Chief of Police

Website
- www.sanantonio.gov/SAPD

The San Antonio Police Department (SAPD) is the primary law enforcement agency serving the City of San Antonio, Texas, United States and some surrounding areas. Its headquarters are at South Santa Rosa district. SAPD is one of the largest municipal police departments in Texas.

The current chief of police is Jesus "Jesse" Salame Jr., who was officially sworn in on September 10, 2026.

== History ==
Early law enforcement in San Antonio begins with the alguacils of the Villa de San Fernando de Bexar and progresses to the Texas Rangers, vigilantes, and City Marshals of early San Antonio.

Officers are issued the Smith & Wesson M&P 9mm S&W as the sidearm. Prior officers were issued the Glock 22 .40 caliber pistol which had been used since the early 1990s. Prior to the Glock officers were issued .357 magnum Smith & Wesson Model 65-2 revolvers.

== Organization ==
The San Antonio Police Department's organization includes a chief of police a command and executive staff, and the use of community crime mapping.

As of November 2018, the department had 2,358 officers of which 1,204 were Hispanic (51.1%), 1,003 were white (42.5%), 119 were Black (5.0%), and 32 other (1.4%).

== Controversy ==
=== Civil rights violations lawsuit ===
In August 2016, during a search on the street, a female officer pulled down a female citizen's shorts and underwear and pulled a tampon out of the woman's vagina, in public, right on the street in the daytime, and in front of five male officers who were watching as well any passersby who were around. The woman sued the City of San Antonio in a Federal civil rights lawsuit stating that her constitutional rights had been violated. In October 2019, the city agreed to pay the woman $205,000 to settle the case.

=== Misconduct arbitration ===
In July 2020, the Mayor of San Antonio, Ron Nirenberg, stated concerns about practices involving arbitrators reinstating police officers after the officers were fired by the chief of police for misconduct. Specifically, an instance of misconduct involved a San Antonio police officer that "allegedly tried to give a homeless man a sandwich filled with dog feces", another involved an officer stating to a man that he would let him free if he could win in a fistfight with the officer, and a third instance involved an officer fired in January 2019 repeatedly using "the n-word as he arrested a Black man for trespassing at a mall". The firings of these three officers by the police chief were overturned by an arbitrator, allowing them to return to police work. In response to such matters, Nirenberg stated to CNN, "We've seen too many cases where the arbitrator has overturned the chief's decision when it's as clear as day that that officer accused of misconduct should no longer be on the force. It's egregious."

The officer who allegedly attempted to give a homeless man a sandwich with dog feces in it was later fired again for another alleged misconduct incident, in which it is alleged that in June 2016 the officer defecated in a women's only restroom toilet and spread "a brown, feces-like substance" on the toilet while on bike patrol. The officer's partner also allegedly defecated in the women's only toilet. In this matter, the arbitrator sided with the chief of police's firing regarding the alleged incident, and the officer was not reinstated to the force.

For the time period of approximately July 2010 to July 2020 (reported in July 2020 as "over the last decade"), 24 cases involving police officers being fired for misconduct have been adjudicated by an independent arbitrator, and 10 officers from these 24 cases were given their jobs back.

=== McDonalds shooting incident ===
On October 2, 2022, Officer James Brennand reportedly fired his weapon a total of ten times at Erik Cantu. The teenage victim was eating a hamburger in a McDonald's parking lot, and he was approached and fired upon while attempting to back away from the officer who drew his firearm. Officer Brennard's employment was terminated after review of the incident by the police department. Cantu was determined to be in critical condition and was placed on life support. On October 11, Brennand was charged with two counts of aggravated assault by a public servant.

== Ranks ==
Below are the current ranks of the San Antonio Police Department.

Rank	Insignia
Chief	
Assistant Chief	
Deputy Chief	
Captain	
Lieutenant	
Sergeant	
Detective-Investigator	
Police Officer	N/A

== See also ==
- List of law enforcement agencies in Texas
- Shooting of Benjamin Marconi
