= Buchanan County Courthouse (Iowa) =

Historic building in Independence, Iowa, US

- Buchanan County Court House
- U.S. National Register of Historic Places
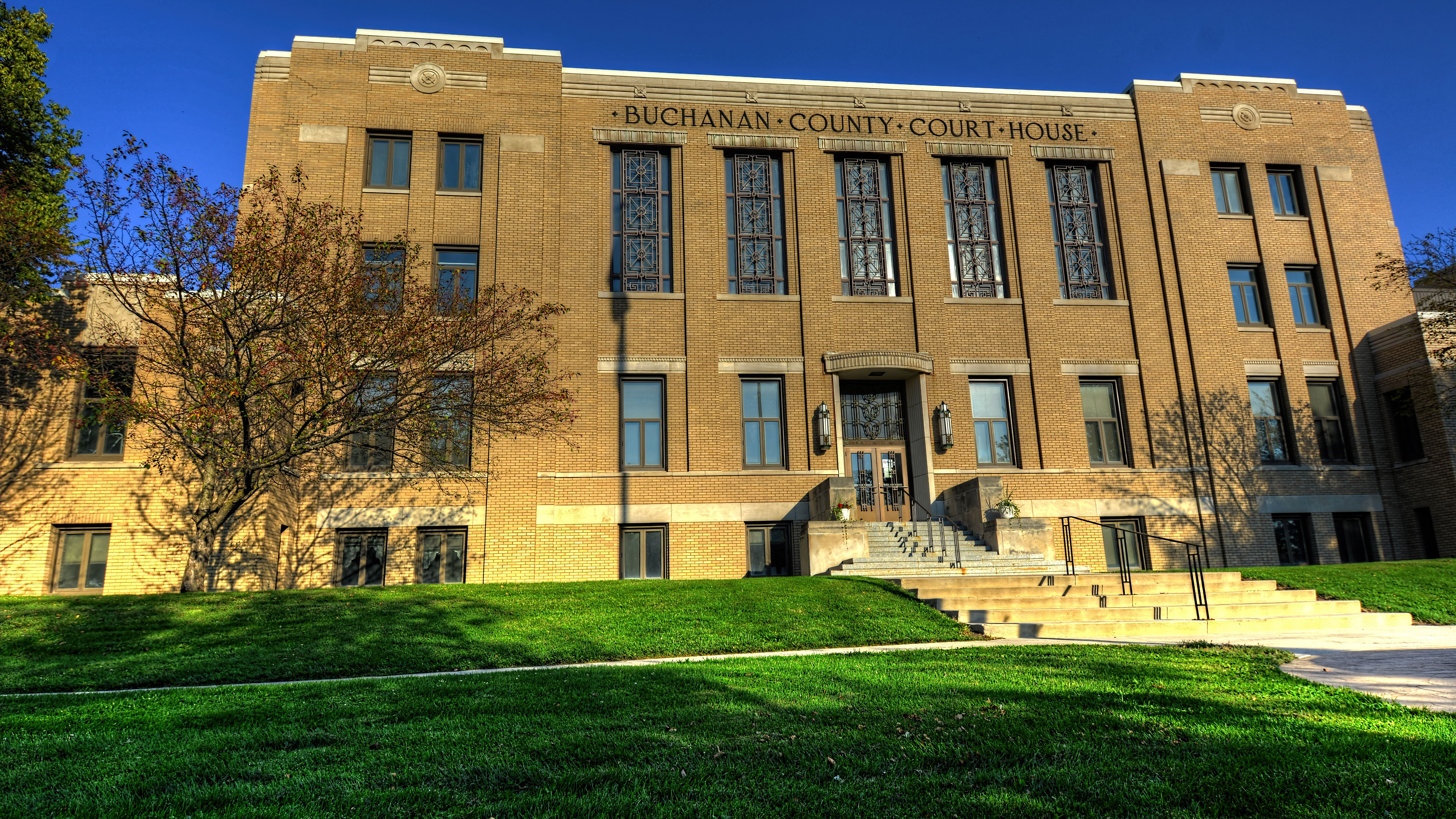

- Location within Iowa Location within the United States
- Interactive map showing the location for Buchanan County Courthouse
- Location: 210 5th Ave. NE; Independence, Iowa
- Coordinates: 42°28′13.2″N 91°53′19.5″W
- Area: less than 5 acres (2.0 ha)
- Built: 1940
- Built by: C.C. Larsen Company
- Architect: Dougher, Rich and Woodburn
- Architectural style: PWA Moderne
- MPS: PWA-Era County Courthouses of IA MPS
- NRHP reference No.: 03000820
- Added to NRHP: August 28, 2003

Buchanan County Court House in Independence, Iowa, United States was built in 1940. It was listed on the National Register of Historic Places in 2003 as a part of the PWA-Era County Courthouses of IA Multiple Properties Submission. The current structure is the third courthouse to house court functions and county administration.

== History ==
A small wooden structure that was built in 1847 was the first building used for court functions. The first term of court was held in a log cabin belonging to Rufus B. Clark and the second term was held in the storeroom of a schoolhouse. A courthouse was finally built in Independence in 1857 for about $10,000. Voters elected to build a new courthouse in 1880 for $7,500.

Des Moines architects Dougher, Rich & Woodburn were retained to design a new courthouse. The county applied for and received a grant from the Public Works Administration (PWA) in 1938. This is one of ten courthouses in Iowa that received PWA funds. County voters approved a bond referendum for additional funding on June 6, 1938. Five houses were removed from an expanded courthouse square and groundbreaking for the new courthouse took place November 15, 1938. The cornerstone was laid on September 20, 1939, and C.C. Larsen Company of Council Bluffs, Iowa was responsible for the building's construction. The county board of supervisors received the completed building on March 22, 1940. The courthouse was dedicated on May 22 of the same year. Nearly 4,000 people attended the parade and heard the address by retired Rear Admiral Harry Yarnell, formerly of Buchanan County, who was the main speaker. The old courthouse was taken down after the new courthouse was dedicated, and landscaping was completed by autumn. On January 5, 1956, Independence police officer Harold Pearce was shot and killed inside the courthouse's sheriff's office by 18-year-old Warren John Nutter, who threw the murder weapon down a courthouse stairwell before fleeing the building. A wing was added to the north end of the courthouse in 1976 to house the county's correctional facility. Subsequently, another addition was built on the south side of the historic building.

== Architecture ==
The architectural style of the historic portion of the building is known as Depression Modern or PWA Moderne. The building features a symmetrical façade with a central section that is flanked by two lower sections. The exterior is clad in buff-colored brick with Bedford limestone trim. It rises three stories above a raised basement. A central corridor on each floor extends the length of the building, with the offices opening onto the corridors. The building features multi-colored terrazzo floors, marble wainscoting, and acoustic tiles. The five tall windows that extend from the second to the third floors of the main elevation mark the location of the courtroom, which was decorated in dark wood tones and Art Deco ornamentation.

The building is located on the courthouse square on the north side of the central business district where the previous courthouse was also located. Two elements on the courthouse square, which itself is a contributing site, are contributing objects on the building's nomination to the National Register of Historic Places. The first element is the building's original flagpole. The second is a replica of the Statue of Liberty (1950), which commemorates the 40th anniversary of the Boy Scouts of America.

== See also ==
- Malek Theater, the other Art Deco building in Independence
