= Capital Area Council of Governments =

- Logo

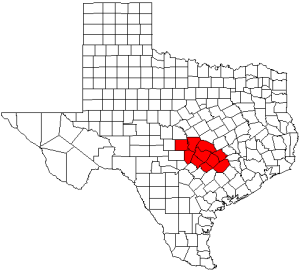
- Map of Texas highlighting counties served by the Capital Area Council of Governments
- Formation: June 1970
- Type: Voluntary association of governments
- Region served: 8,480 sq mi (22,000 km^{2})
- Members: 10 counties

Historical population
Year	Pop.	±%
2000	1,346,833	—
2010	1,830,003	+35.9%
2020	2,407,031	+31.5%

The Capital Area Council of Governments (CAPCOG) is a voluntary association of cities, counties and special districts in Central Texas.

Based in Austin, the Capital Area Council of Governments is a member of the Texas Association of Regional Councils.

== Counties served ==
- Bastrop
- Blanco
- Burnet
- Caldwell
- Fayette
- Hays
- Lee
- Llano
- Travis
- Williamson

== Largest cities in the region ==
- Austin
- Round Rock
- San Marcos
- Cedar Park
- Georgetown
- Pflugerville
- Taylor
- Lockhart
- Kyle
- Leander
