= Capital Area Metropolitan Planning Organization =

Metropolitan planning organization in Texas, US

The Capital Area Metropolitan Planning Organization (CAMPO) is the federally mandated metropolitan planning organization (MPO) responsible for comprehensive transportation planning in the Austin, Texas, US area, including Williamson, Travis, Hays, Bastrop, Burnet and Caldwell counties. CAMPO is one of 25 Texas MPOs.

MPOs are federally required throughout the country in areas with a population of 50,000 or more and are required to produce a 20+ year transportation plan, called a Regional Transportation Plan (RTP), and a four-year planning document called the Transportation Improvement Program (TIP).

== Governance ==
CAMPO is governed by a 21-member Transportation Policy Board, or TPB, made up of 19 elected officials, a representative from TxDOT, and a representative from Capital Metro. The TPB is the body that makes decisions on CAMPO policy and decides how CAMPO funding is allocated.

The 24-member Technical Advisory Committee, or TAC, is composed of staff from local jurisdictions throughout the region. The TAC's purpose is to provide technical expertise, and recommendations to inform the Policy Board in their decision-making processes.

== Staff ==
CAMPO currently has a staff of 15, including the Executive Director Ashby Johnson.

CAMPO staff conduct planning work and make recommendations to the Technical Advisory Committee (TAC) and Transportation Policy Board (TPB).

The CAMPO staff office is located at 8303 N. MoPac Expy, Suite A210, Austin, Texas.

== Plans ==
All MPOs are required to complete and adopt plans on a recurring basis, and as governed by their Board.

The Regional Transportation Plan, or RTP, is a document that is adopted by the CAMPO Board every five years and covers at least 20 years into the future. This plan is required to be multimodal, meaning it incorporates a variety of transportation modes. Not only roads and highways, but also transit, walking, and biking.

The Transportation Improvement Program, or TIP, covers a shorter span of four years. Projects listed in the TIP must be consistent with what is in the RTP. For a project to be in the TIP, it must have funding and be ready to begin construction in the four-year TIP time frame. The TIP is adopted every two years.

The Unified Planning Work Program (UPWP) details CAMPO planning programs for a two-year time period. The UPWP is adopted every two years and may be amended if CAMPO planning programs change.

== Funding ==
CAMPO receives all its funding through the U.S. Department of Transportation and Texas Department of Transportation.
