= Murder of Benjamin Marconi =

Murder of a police officer in Texas, U.S.

Shooting of Benjamin Marconi
- Date: November 20, 2016
- Time: Before 11:40 a.m.
- Location: San Antonio, Texas, U.S.
- Deaths: 1
- Convicted: Otis Tyrone McKane
- Charges: Capital murder
- Verdict: Guilty

On November 20, 2016, Benjamin Marconi, a detective with the San Antonio Police Department, was shot to death in San Antonio, Texas. In the shooting, a motorist stopped his car, got out, and shot and wounded Marconi while the latter was sitting in his marked patrol car in front of the department's headquarters, writing a ticket for another driver during a routine traffic stop.

Marconi, who was shot twice in the head, later died at a hospital, while the shooter fled in his car. The gunman, identified as Otis Tyrone McKane, was arrested the next day after a massive manhunt, and charged with capital murder. The shooting, which occurred on the same day as three other unrelated attacks against police officers elsewhere in the U.S., increased already high concerns about the safety of law enforcement.

== Shooting ==
The shooting occurred in front of the San Antonio Police Department headquarters before noon. Detective Marconi was sitting inside his patrol car, writing a traffic ticket for a motorist he had pulled over. Another motorist pulled up from behind him, walked out of his car, approached Marconi's side window, and shot him in the head. He then reached through the open window, shot Marconi in the head again and then fled in his car. The shooter was believed to have had no relationship to the original motorist who was pulled over. Marconi, a 50-year-old officer who had been with the department for 20 years, later died at the San Antonio Military Medical Center at 12:22 p.m. He was the first San Antonio police officer to die in the line of duty since 2013.

== Aftermath ==
Investigators believed the shooter was targeting police officers in general. The shooting took place on the same day as three other attacks against police officers in St. Louis and Gladstone, Missouri, and Sanibel, Florida; these shootings were unrelated to one another and the San Antonio shooting, and resulted in serious but non-fatal injuries.

At the time of these shootings, there was already an "alarming spike in ambush-style attacks", and the total number of attacks on uniformed officers was reportedly up in 2016. This was also the 60th shooting homicide of a police officer in 2016, already representing a significant increase from 2015's total of 41 officers shot and killed. San Antonio Police Chief William McManus compared the killing to the recent mass shootings in Dallas, Texas, and Baton Rouge, Louisiana.

== Perpetrator ==
Otis Tyrone McKane, aged 31, was identified as the shooter. He was arrested on the day following the shooting, after a massive manhunt, while riding in a car owned by his wife, Christian Chanel Fields, with an unidentified woman and a child sitting inside, on Interstate 10. McKane had visited the San Antonio police headquarters and briefly spoke to a clerk four hours before the shooting. He had a criminal record, including a charge of assault causing bodily harm to a spouse, recorded in 2012. He married Fields the morning after the shooting, and was arrested later that day.

Following his arrest, McKane was charged with capital murder and jailed on a US$2,000,000 bond. While being escorted out of the police station to be taken to Bexar County Jail, he claimed to reporters that he had been upset at the court system for not allowing him to see his son, and also issued an apology to Marconi's family.

== Legal proceedings ==
The trial was first scheduled for early 2019. Due to the COVID-19 pandemic, the trial was postponed until July 12, 2021. This was the first death penalty case in Bexar County in five years. On July 28, 2021, McKane was found guilty of Marconi's murder. After the verdict was announced, McKane removed his tie, unbuttoned and untucked his shirt and struck a bailiff attempting to handcuff him in the face with his elbow before being tackled out of the courtroom by several other deputies. On August 7, 2021, McKane was sentenced to death. McKane is currently incarcerated at Allan B. Polunsky Unit.

== Reactions ==
Governor Greg Abbott condemned the killing and proclaimed that "attacks against law enforcement officers will not be tolerated in Texas and must be met with swift justice." Mayor Ivy Taylor also condemned the killing, called for patience in the ongoing investigation, and extended her condolences to Marconi's family. President-elect Donald Trump called Marconi's family to offer his condolences. Other law enforcement agencies sent tributes for Marconi on social media.

On the day after the shooting, Governor Abbott urged the Texas Legislature to pass his proposed Police Protection Act, which would classify attacks against law enforcement officers as hate crimes. The act received support from James Pasco, executive producer of the Fraternal Order of Police, who also expressed concern about the San Antonio killing and the three other shootings in Missouri and Florida, and blamed the erosion of trust in law enforcement on politicians, activists, and the media.

The San Antonio Police Department made a Facebook post announcing McKane's arrest, which was accompanied by his mug shot. County Judge James Oakley, the "chief legislator and executive" for Burnet County, Texas, who does not preside over criminal courts, controversially re-posted the mug shot with the comment "Time for a tree and a rope...", which was taken as a reference to lynching. Oakley deleted the comment shortly afterwards and apologized for his choice of words. He told the Huffington Post that he did not intend to make a racially charged comment, and later described his intent for the post as being to reflect on "the cowardly crime of the senseless murder of a law enforcement officer" and that his view of McKane "is the same regardless of ethnicity."

Chief McManus announced that, as a result of the shooting, San Antonio police officers would not be conducting traffic stops alone. The four shootings on November 10 prompted some police departments to send their officers out in pairs until further notice.

== See also ==
- 2016 shootings of Des Moines police officers
- Gun violence in the United States
- List of American police officers killed in the line of duty
