= Des Moines Police Department (Iowa) =

Municipal police department in Iowa, US

- Abbreviation: DMPD

Agency overview
- Annual budget: $74.2 million (2021)

Jurisdictional structure
- Operations jurisdiction: Des Moines, Iowa, United States
- Map of Des Moines Police Department's jurisdiction
- General nature: Local civilian police

Operational structure
- Headquarters: 25 East 1st Street; Des Moines, Iowa
- Sworn members: 376
- Unsworn members: 109
- Agency executive: Michael McTaggart, Chief of Police

Facilities
- Stations: 2 (Including traffic unit)

Website
- Des Moines Police Department

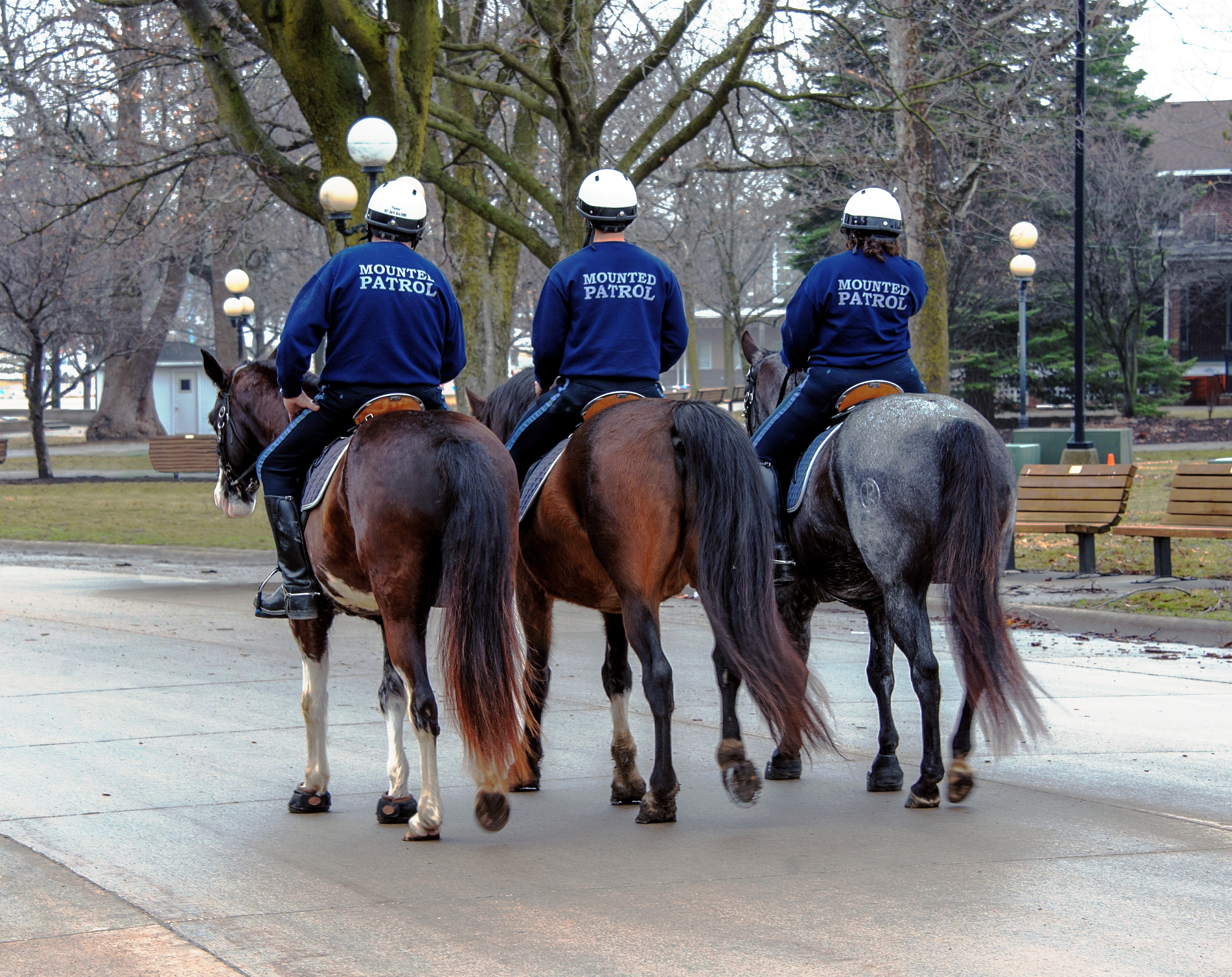
Mounted unit

The Des Moines Police Department is the municipal police department for the city of Des Moines, Iowa. The department is the largest law enforcement agency in the state of Iowa.

== History ==
On January 21, 1896, the size of Des Moines increased significantly when state legislature granted the city a new charter allowing it to absorb the eight towns surrounding the city. As the size of the city increased, the need for public safety increased. In 1908 the city auditor issued an annual report of the city which stated appointed the Chief of Police. By the turn of the 20th century the police department was loosely structured and consisted of a patrol division and administration division. The patrol division consisted of patrol officers and detectives while the administration division consisted of jail staff.

The Des Moines Police Department saw a decrease in the number of public disorder arrests between 1910 and 1920, which is attributed to the fact that in 1911 patrol officers began patrolling in automobiles and were less likely to observe public disorder incidents.

Department Arrest Statistics from 1900 to 1970 (* per 1,000 population)

Year	Public Disorder Arrests	Felony Arrests	Larceny Arrests
1900	67	1.15	3.23
1910	53	0.82	2.95
1920	14	0.64	1.81
1930	16	0.69	1.45
1940	27	3.17	10.64
1950	22	3.15	8.82
1960	21	6.76	18.34
1970	25	11.48	35.86

== Organizational structure ==
The Des Moines Police Department consists of three separate divisions.

- Administrative Services Division
- Operations Division
  - The division consists of the Patrol Services Bureau and the Homeland Security Bureau. The Homeland Security Bureau includes Airport Security, Bomb Squad, Fusion Center, and Metro Special Tactics and Response.
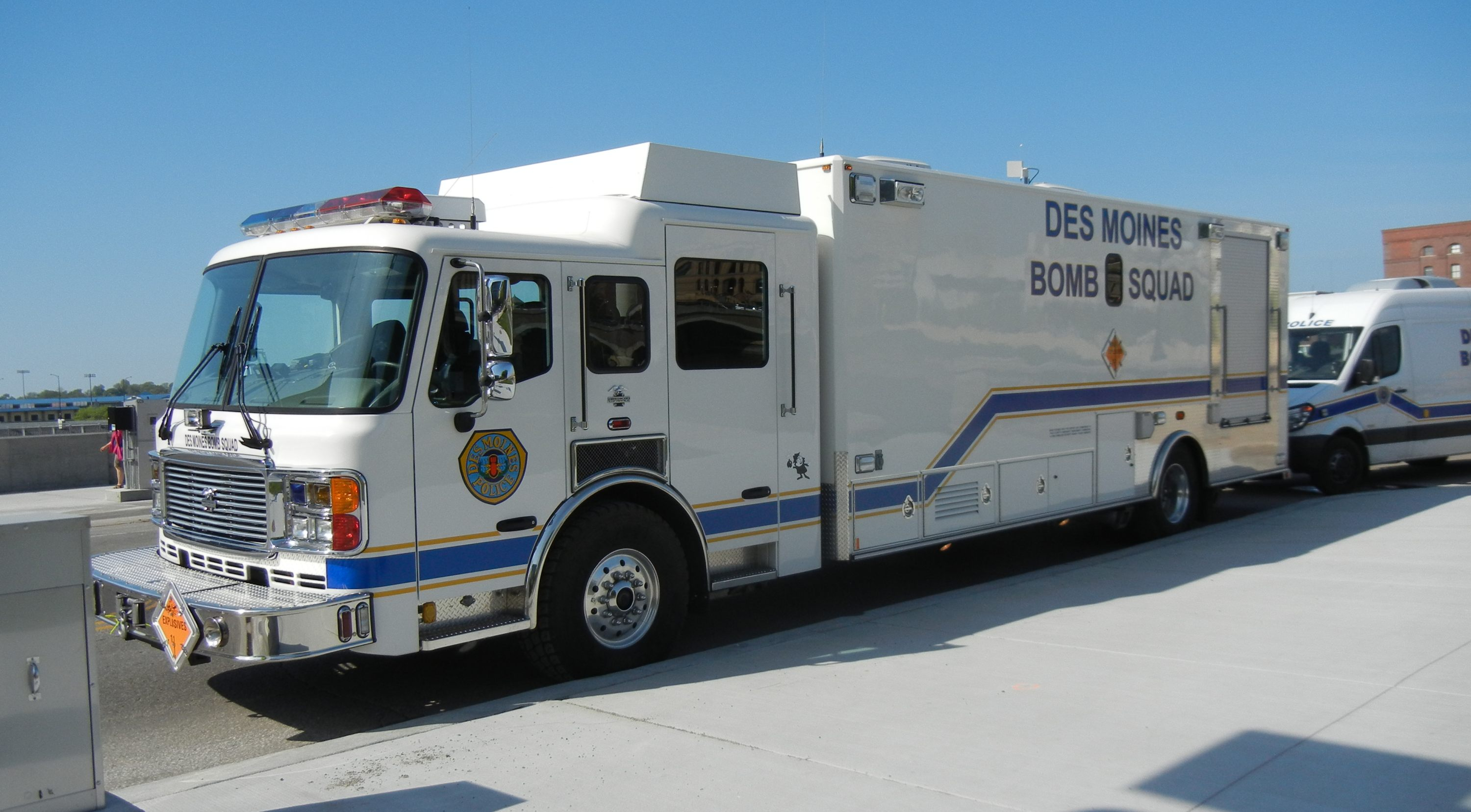
- Des Moines Police Department Bomb Squad
  Investigations Division
  - The division consists of the Detective Bureau.

== Substation ==
In addition to the police department headquarters, the Des Moines Police Department also has a substation located at 1300 Scott Ave, Des Moines, Iowa. The substation houses the Des Moines Police Department Traffic Unit.

== November 2016 shooting ==
On November 2, 2016, Des Moines Police Department Officer Sergeant Anthony Beminio and Urbandale Police Department Officer Justin Martin were killed in ambush-style shootings near Des Moines. The shooting received national attention as President Barack Obama described the killings as “shameful acts of violence," and continued on to say “Sgt. Anthony Beminio and Officer Justin Martin represented our best, most decent instincts as human beings — to serve our neighbors, to put ourselves in harm’s way for someone else.” The lone suspect, Scott Michael Greene, was quickly identified and apprehended by the Dallas County Sheriff's Office and the Iowa State Patrol the same day.

== Fallen officers ==
In the history of the Des Moines Police Department, 23 officers and 1 K9 unit have been killed in the line of duty.

Officer	Date of death	Cause of death
Sergeant Anthony David Beminio	November 2, 2016	Gunfire
Police Officer Susan Louise Farrell	March 26, 2016	Drunk driver
Police Officer Carlos Puente-Morales	March 26, 2016	Drunk driver
Police Officer Roger Ray Hildreth	February 21, 2008	Heart attack
Police Officer Sean Wissink	February 11, 2007	Automobile accident
Police Officer Dennis Earl Hill	August 28, 1977	Gunfire
Patrolman Brian Charles Melton	April 21, 1977	Gunfire
Patrolman James Emory Rodine	August 13, 1968	Gunfire (Accidental)
Captain Charles T. Andreano	July 30, 1964	Automobile accident
Patrolman George Wesley Schane	May 4, 1942	Gunfire (Accidental)
Captain Steven Tabor Howard	March 2, 1935	Gunfire
Sergeant Harry Linn Booton	December 11, 1932	Gunfire
Sergeant James Joshua Cowart	December 7, 1931	Gunfire
Sergeant Rupert L. Shepherd	August 1, 1930	Motorcycle accident
Patrolman Harry Ogilvie	July 12, 1930	Gunfire
Patrolman James A. Staggs	April 20, 1928	Vehicular assault
Patrolman Gerald D. Pickett	September 24, 1925	Motorcycle accident
Patrolman Ollie D. Thomas	August 20, 1925	Gunfire
Detective Cornelius J. McCarthy	September 27, 1919	Gunfire
Chief of Police Charles Chester Jackson	December 16, 1918	Gunfire
Officer George William Mattern	April 12, 1918	Gunfire
Detective Frank Delmege	September 20, 1909	Gunfire
Special Officer Edward H. "Elijah" Wishart	July 1, 1891	Gunfire
K9 Unit	Date of death	Cause of death
K9 Harley	August 29, 2012	Heat exhaustion

== List of Des Moines Chiefs of Police ==
A list of Police of Chiefs for the Des Moines Police Department. As of October 17, 2024 there have been a total of 59 Chiefs of Police.

#	Name	Period as Chief of Police
1	J. Youngerman	1852-1853
2	P. Bower	1853-1854
3	J. Youngerman	1854-1855
4	J. Harter	1855-1856
5	T. Hall	1856-1857
6	S. Noel	1857-1858
7	J.T. Moore	1858-1859
8	R. Hedge	1859-1860
9	L. Jones	1860-1861
10	Jester Hedge	1861-1862
11	A.N. Marsh	1862-1863
12	S. Noel	1863-1865
13	W. Lowry	1865-1866
14	S.H. Carson	1866-1869
15	F.M. Smith	1869-1870
16	S.H. Carson	1870-1871
17	M.T. Russell	1871-1873
18	W.M. Patchen	1873-1874
19	Adam Hafner	1874-1876
20	J.S. Davis	1876-1877
21	George Christ	1877-1878
22	J.H. Bryant	1878-1880
23	John Smith	1880-1882
24	A.H. Botkin	1882-1883
25	Adam Hafner	1883-1886
26	A.H. Botkin	1886-1889
27	Alfred Jarvis	1889-1890
28	Sol Stutsman	1890-1892
29	Fred Johnson	1892-1900
30	James W. Jones	1900-1908
31	William P. Hume	1908
32	Ab Day	1908-1909
33	A.G. Miller	1909-1910
34	George Yeager	1910-1916
35	C.C. Jackson	1916-1918
36	M.J. Donoghue	1918-1922
37	Roscoe Daunders	1922
38	John B. Hammond	1922-1924
39	James Cavender	1924-1927
40	Roy J. Chamberlain	1927-1928
41	Henry A. Alber	1928-1939
42	Floyd Hartzer	1939-1940
43	Tom R. Watson	1940-1941
44	Tom Petit	1941-1942
45	Joe Loehr	1942-1943
46	Floyd Hartzer	1943-1944
47	Victor T. Smith	1944-1946
48	Floyd Hartzer *	1946-1947
49	Lorin Miller	1947-1950
50	F.E. Mabee	1950-1952
51	Howard R. Eide	1952-1961
52	Vear V. Douglas	1961-1969
53	Wendell E. Nichols	1969-1979
54	Billie B. Wallace	1979-1984
55	William H. Moulder	1984-2003
56	William M. McCarthy	2003-2007
57	Judy Bradshaw	2007 - October, 2014
58	Dana Wingert	February 10, 2015 - October 16, 2024
59	Michael McTaggart	October 17, 2024 - Current

*: Is labeled as "Assistant chief" on the list, there is no clear indication as to what that specifically means in context.
