= Iowa State Penitentiary =

Prison in Fort Madison, Iowa, United States

- Interactive map of Iowa State Penitentiary
- Location: Fort Madison, Iowa; 40°39′5.4″N 91°18′12.96″W
- Status: Open
- Security class: Maximum-Medium
- Capacity: 760
- Opened: 2015
- Managed by: Iowa Department of Corrections
- Warden: Chris Tripp

The Iowa State Penitentiary (ISP) is an Iowa Department of Corrections maximum security prison for men located in the Lee County, Iowa, community of Fort Madison. This facility should not be confused with the Historical Iowa State Penitentiary, which was shut down in 2015 after being open for 175 years. The HISP itself was a 550-person maximum security unit. Also on the complex was a John Bennett Correctional Center - a 169-person medium security unit. The HISP included two minimum-security farms with about 170 people who were located within a few miles of the main complex. The complex also had a ten-person multiple care unit, and a 120-bed special-needs unit for prisoners with mental illness or other diseases that require special medical care. In total, there were about 950 inmates and 510 staff members.

The current Iowa State Penitentiary remains in the same city as the HISP, the community of Fort Madison, but is simply on a different property about a mile away up the road. The current ISP is now the only functioning Iowa State Penitentiary in Fort Madison, as the HISP was shut down in 2015 when all of the inmates were moved. ISP has the facilities to hold a maximum of 760 inmates, who are dispersed into several different units, including two that are used for general population inmates, one that is used for inmates in restricted housing, and a medical unit. ISP offers many opportunities for the incarcerated individuals, including opportunities in gaining an education through the local community college, Southeastern Community College, and apprenticeship opportunities through the United States Department of Labor. Inmates also have access to numerous recreational activities, including cabinetry and woodworking.

== History ==
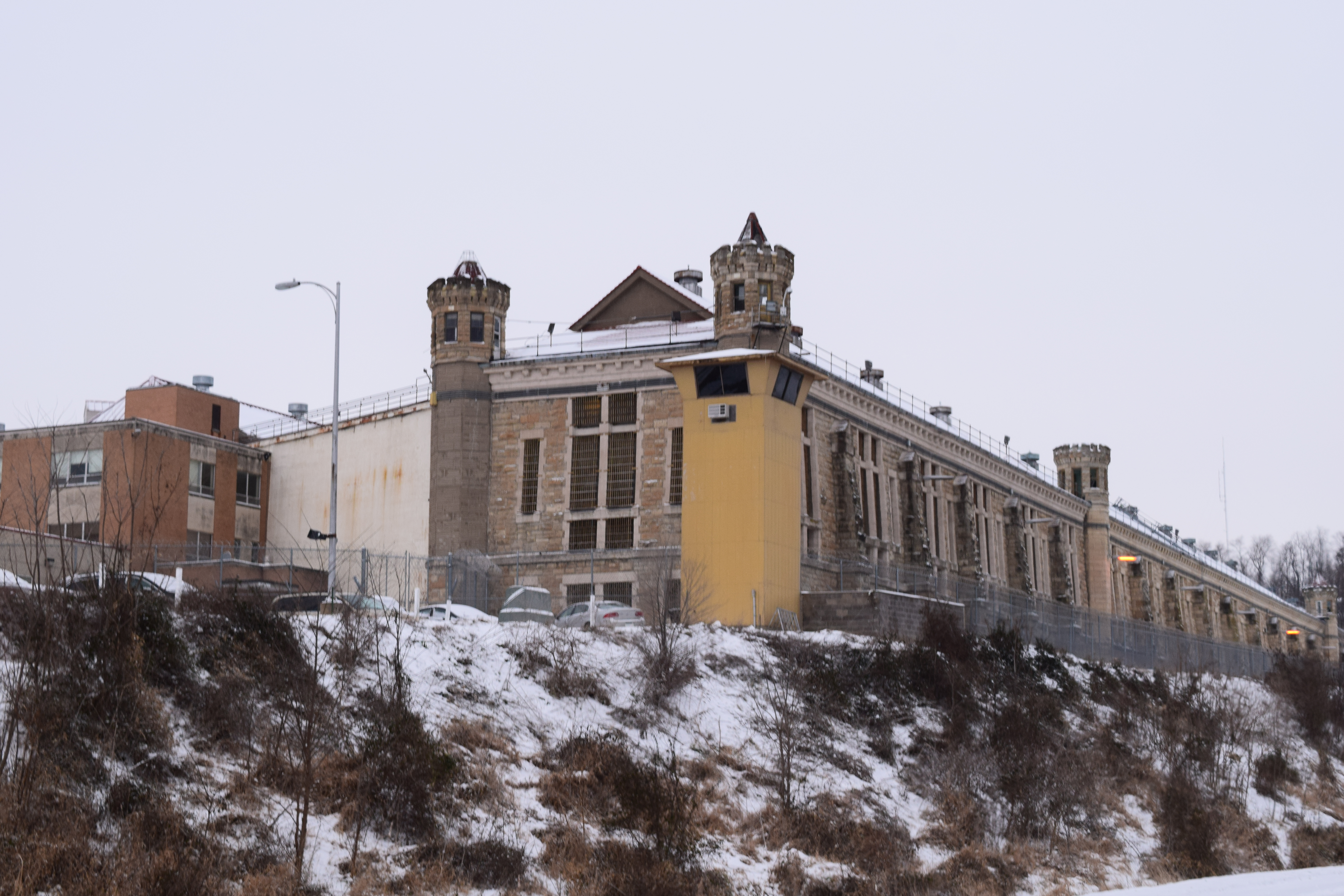
The exterior of the original Iowa State Penitentiary

The Historic Iowa State Penitentiary was established in 1839, one year after Iowa became a territory, and seven years before it became a state in 1846. HISP was patterned after the penitentiary in Auburn, New York. In 1982 the prison was remodeled, and unitization was introduced at HISP. The unitization divided the large cell blocks into smaller units that were easier to manage. In 2008 the prison's library was moved to another location on the grounds. The HISP library offered an extensive book collection, as well as computers for inmate use. However, prisoners do not have access to the internet.

Before the abolition of capital punishment in Iowa, executions were performed at Fort Madison. An interesting note in the history of the prison was the execution of Victor Feguer. Feguer was a drifter who had murdered Dubuque doctor Edward Bartels. After appeals that even went as far as President John F. Kennedy were denied, Feguer was executed by hanging on March 15, 1963. Feguer was the last inmate in the Federal prison system to be put to death for nearly 40 years until the execution of Timothy McVeigh at the Terre Haute, Indiana Federal Prison in 2001. Feguer also became the last person in Iowa to be executed; soon after his death, Iowa abolished the death penalty. While Feguer's death attracted little attention at the time, the execution of McVeigh attracted renewed interest in the Feguer execution.

=== 1981 Riot ===
The 1981 riot was on September 2, and lasted from approximately 10:20 AM–9:25 PM.

Several inmates started the uprising by taking four hostages, among them Security Director James Mekne and Assistant Security Director Larry Moline, who were later released in exchange for the offenders being allowed to talk to the news media about prisoner grievances. In addition, eight newly hired employees at ISP were also taken hostage and forced to trade clothes with the offenders. Most were beaten. It was originally thought this incident was spontaneous although it was later reported it was the result of a plan conceived and executed by a handful of inmates. Inmates used a tractor to pull the door off Cellhouse 20. By the time the offenders had broken in, law enforcement personnel had cut the bars out of the cell house, removed the employees who had been hiding there and rewelded the bars back shut. A forklift from the Prison Industries facility was taken in an attempt to break into Cellhouse 17 West, which held protective custody inmates. No prisoners escaped.

Kenneth Sheffey, 31, was the original uprising spokesman. He was serving life in prison for the first-degree murder of Roddy Lee Hahn, 15. He made numerous demands, including getting to speak with selected members of the media to air some of the inmates' grievances.

Three bloodied inmates (a robber, a burglar, and an arsonist) were found locked in their cells Monday morning after the riot had been contained. It was thought at least one was a person other inmates didn't like very well. After the incident, they were taken to University of Iowa Hospitals in Iowa City. Up to 15 prisoners were actively involved in the uprising, but it was estimated that 60 of the 90 inmates in the cellblock were outside their cells when the assault teams burst in.

One inmate, Gary Eugene Tyson, was murdered. Other prisoners believed Tyson was talking to authorities who were investigating the May 1981 death of Allen Lewis, another inmate. It was because of this act that officials believed the riot had been started. Tyson's body was found in a storage room attached to the prison kitchen. Tyson had been stabbed nine times in the neck, nine times in the left side of the chest, three times in the left side of the back, and once in the left hand. A makeshift knife was still protruding from Tyson's neck. Evidence produced at trial would permit the jury to find the following facts: Tyson was a member of the prison gang known as the "Almighty Vice Lords." During the murder investigation of Lewis, a number of Vice Lords were placed in "segregation" (locked status) in Cellblock 20. Among them were Tyson and the undisputed leader of the gang, Allen Langely. Langley received two life sentences in connection with the slaying of Tyson and a life sentence for the May 1981 slaying of Lewis. He was charged with first-degree murder in both slayings.

Hal Farrier, Dept. of Corrections director at the time, ordered assault teams into the prison without consulting Gov. Terry Branstad as time was of the essence. The squads converged on the cellblock from all directions. Some inmates gave minor resistance. Some were armed with table legs and broken broom handles. Prison officials said there were 536 inmates in the 550-capacity prison when the uprising began.

The warden at the time of the riot was David Scurr. The deputy warden was Paul Hedgepeth.

More than $1 million in property damage was done.

=== 2005 Escape ===
On November 14, 2005, two inmates were the first to escape from the facility since 1979. The two men, Robert Joseph Legendre and Martin Shane Moon used upholstery webbing to scale one of the prison's limestone walls. This webbing was used by the prison industries program to make furniture. Both Legendre and Moon were serving life sentences. Moon was convicted of murdering his roommate in 1990 and Legendre was serving a life sentence for attempted murder, weapons, and drug charges. Legendre was serving time at the prison as part of a program between the states of Iowa and Nevada.

Following the escape the prison was locked down. The pair was believed to have stolen a 1995 gold Pontiac Bonneville with the license plate number 776-NOW. After escaping the pair split up.

On November 17, Moon was captured near Chester, Illinois. Authorities discovered him sleeping in a stolen vehicle near Menard State Prison. Around 3 am, law enforcement approached the car and asked Moon for his ID. Moon instead started the vehicle and led police on a short chase. He later left the vehicle and tried to flee on foot, but was apprehended at that point. He waived extradition and was returned to Fort Madison. The next day Legendre was captured in Caruthersville, Missouri. He has yet to be returned to Iowa, and remains in custody in Missouri.

The main reason the two inmates were able to escape was because the wall they scaled was unguarded—the nearest guard tower was unmanned due to low staff levels. Corrections officials indicated that budget cuts had forced them to lower staffing levels. These escapes touched off a political debate in Iowa. Democratic state senator Gene Fraise of Fort Madison suggested that the staffing levels were the primary reason the escapes were successful. Republicans have countered that advances in technology have allowed for prison resources to be redirected.

Governor Tom Vilsack had an investigation undertaken into the incident. Several employees were disciplined in the wake of the escapes, and warden Ken Burger was replaced by John Ault—who had been warden at the Anamosa, Iowa prison. Vilsack also asked for recommendations on whether or not a new maximum security institution should be built—which he estimated could cost up to $40 million. After completion the cost for the new Iowa State Penitentiary was actually $175 million.

=== Prison Replacement ===
Groundbreaking ceremonies were held in Fort Madison on Thursday, April 22, 2010, for a new, nearly 800 inmate prison to replace the Iowa State Penitentiary. Governor Chet Culver led the ceremony for the projected $130 million project which was scheduled to be completed in 2014, but delays resulted in the opening being pushed to 2015 and costs ended up reaching $175 million. The new Iowa State Penitentiary was completed in 2014, though some problems kept the new facility from opening on schedule, inmates were transferred from the old facility on August 1, 2015. As of August 2016, there continued to be concerns raised by AFSCME, the union representing Iowa's state employees, about staffing levels at Iowa's prisons; often after injuries of either prisoners and/or corrections officers became known to the public. However, Republican governor at the time, Terry Branstad, and the Republican-controlled Iowa House of Representatives insisted that staffing levels were adequate.

The state offered to transfer ownership of HISP over to the city who initially planned to turn the prison into a museum sometime in 2014, in order to boost tourism to the city.

In May 2017 the former prison was opened for a one time tour, with current and retired prison employees acting as guards. The prison is still owned by the state of Iowa, who pays about $1,000 a day to keep the lights on and the site secure. The city wants an environmental study to be done before prison ownership is transferred to a non-profit entity.

== Religious Freedom of Prisoners ==
In an MSNBC episode of Lockup: Raw, the prisons extensive religious programs were profiled. Iowa State Penitentiary allows inmates to participate in a wide range of religious observations, ranging from Buddhism and Wicca to Satanism. In the episode a group of inmates can be seen lighting candles and using a gong during a Satanic service, after which various aspects of the Satanic Bible are discussed on camera. During the filming, the prison's chaplain speaks of the importance of religious practice to the inmates daily lives.

== Notable inmates ==
- Charles Brown and Charles Kelley - spree killers who killed three people and wounded three more in 1961; became the last two people executed by Iowa.
- Scott Michael Greene - murderer in the 2016 murders of Des Moines police officers.
- Victor Feguer - last man executed at the Iowa State Penitentiary; hanged on a federal kidnapping conviction.
- Warren John Nutter - murderer who was the longest-serving inmate in Iowa history, serving 65 years, 9 months, and 28 days.
- Cristhian Bahena Rivera - murderer serving a life sentence for the 2018 murder of Mollie Tibbetts.
- Chai Vang - mass murderer serving a life sentence for shooting six people to death on November 21, 2004.
- Gregory Scarpa Jr. - High-ranking member of the Colombo Crime Family. Scarpa was being held here on an inter-state compact before being granted a compassionate release for end stage cancer.
- Donald Piper - murderer serving two life sentences for killing two women in hotels in 1993 and 1997; suspected in other murders.
- Willard Miller - Serving life sentence with a minimum term before parole of 35 years for the murder of Nohema Graber, his Spanish high school teacher over a bad grade.

== See also ==
- List of Iowa state prisons
