= Victor Feguer =

American executed murderer (1935–1963)

Victor Harry Feguer
- Feguer on March 5, 1963
- Born: June 10, 1935; St. Johns, Michigan, U.S.
- Died: March 15, 1963 (aged 27); Iowa State Penitentiary, Iowa, U.S.
- Status: Executed by hanging
- Conviction: Kidnapping
- Penalty: Death

Details
- Victims: Edward Bartels, 34
- Date: July 11, 1960
- Country: United States
- States: Illinois (murder); Iowa (kidnapping); Nebraska (possessing a stolen vehicle)
- Weapon: Pistol

Victor Harry Feguer (June 10, 1935 – March 15, 1963) was an American convicted murderer who was known as the last federal inmate executed in the United States before the moratorium on the death penalty following Furman v. Georgia, as well as the last person put to death in the state of Iowa. While the media did not pay much attention to Feguer or his execution at the time, Timothy McVeigh's execution sparked renewed media interest in him nearly four decades later.

== Background ==
Feguer was a drifter, native to the state of Michigan. In the summer of 1960, Feguer arrived in Dubuque, Iowa, renting a room at a decrepit boarding house. Soon after arriving, Feguer began phoning physicians alphabetically from the local Yellow Pages and found Edward Bartels. Feguer claimed that a woman needed medical attention. When Bartels arrived, Feguer kidnapped and killed him in Illinois. Bartels' body was found in a cornfield there with a single gunshot to the head. A few days later, Feguer was arrested in Birmingham, Alabama, after trying to sell Bartels' car to James B. Alford, who tipped off the FBI. Alford later told a local newspaper he suspected Feguer was a crook because he had an out-of-state car but no title papers.

Authorities believe that Feguer had kidnapped and killed Bartels in order to gain access to any drugs that Bartels may have carried to treat patients. Because Feguer transported his hostage across state lines, federal charges were filed against Feguer. In his defense, Feguer claimed a drug addict from Chicago, whom Feguer met in Dubuque, had actually murdered Bartels. Feguer said he killed the drug addict and dumped his body in the Mississippi River. However, authorities could not find any evidence that this other person ever existed.

Because Feguer crossed state lines during the commission of the crimes, he was tried and convicted in federal court. He was sentenced to death. Feguer submitted an appeal, which was denied. At that point, only President John F. Kennedy could have commuted the death sentence. Iowa's governor, Harold Hughes, an opponent of capital punishment, along with Feguer's attorney, contacted Kennedy to request clemency for Feguer. Kennedy thought the crime was so brutal that he denied their request.

== Last days ==
=== At Fort Madison ===
Victor Feguer was held at the federal penitentiary at Leavenworth, Kansas. He was taken back to Iowa because Leavenworth was not set up at the time to perform executions.

On March 5, 1963, Feguer was taken to the Iowa State Penitentiary at Fort Madison, Iowa and placed in the state's death row to await execution. He remained there for the next ten days until his execution was carried out. He spent those ten days quietly; guards said he was a model prisoner.

=== March 15, 1963 ===
For his last meal, Feguer requested a single olive with the pit still in it. He told guards he hoped an olive tree would sprout from his grave "as a sign of peace".

On March 14, 1963, Feguer sat in an all-night vigil with a Roman Catholic priest. Between 4 and 5 in the morning of March 15, Feguer was given a new suit for his execution. Two guards escorted him to the execution room, and he was executed by hanging. The witnesses included an Associated Press journalist and John Ely, then a member of the Iowa House of Representatives, whose witnessing of the execution reinforced his opposition to the death penalty, leading him to work to abolish the state death penalty in Iowa, which occurred in 1965, but which had no effect on the federal law under which Feguer had been executed. After Feguer was pronounced dead, authorities found the pit from the olive in one of his suit pockets.

The body was removed by a local funeral home. Feguer's death certificate listed "Execution. Fracture Cervical Spinal Column" as the cause of death. Feguer is buried in an unmarked grave in Fort Madison City Cemetery in Iowa wearing a second new suit that was provided for his burial.

== Aftermath ==
Victor Feguer would be the last person to be executed in Iowa (but not the last executed for a crime committed in the state). After Feguer's death, it would be nearly 40 years until the next federal execution – that of Timothy McVeigh, carried out on June 11, 2001, in Terre Haute, Indiana.

Iowa abolished capital punishment for all crimes in 1965. Over the years, several attempts have been made to reinstate the death penalty in Iowa. This became a major issue in the 1994 election, as a young girl had recently been murdered, as well as in 2005 after the murder of another young girl. However, the legislature declined to reinstate capital punishment.

The next Iowa crime to result in the death penalty was handed in 2005 to Dustin Lee Honken and Angela Jane Johnson following the 1993 murder of five people in a continuing criminal enterprise, which is a federal offense and thus eligible for the federal death penalty. Johnson had her sentence commuted to life without parole in 2012, but Honken was executed in 2020, like McVeigh, at the United States Penitentiary in Terre Haute, Indiana, as is the standard for a federal execution.

Previous Iowa governor Tom Vilsack made it clear that he would veto legislation that would restore capital punishment, even if it was only on a limited basis. As of 2024 Iowa is one of 23 U.S. states to have completely abolished capital punishment.

== See also ==
- Capital punishment by the United States federal government
- List of people executed by the United States federal government
- List of people executed in the United States in 1963
