= Iowa State Patrol =

State patrol of Iowa

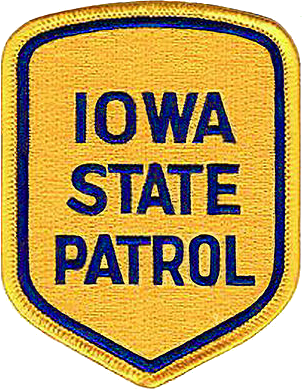
- Patch of Iowa State Patrol

- Flag of Iowa
- Abbreviation: ISP
- Motto: Courtesy, Service, Protection.

Agency overview
- Formed: 1935; 91 years ago
- Preceding agencies: Iowa Highway Safety Patrol; Iowa Highway Patrol
- Employees: 9,253 (as of 2018)

Jurisdictional structure
- Operations jurisdiction: Iowa, US
- Iowa State Patrol Districts
- Area: 56,272 square miles (145,700 km^{2})
- Population: 3,238,387 (2025est.)
- General nature: Civilian police

Operational structure
- Headquarters: Des Moines, Iowa
- Troopers: 370 (authorized, as of 2018)
- Civilian employees: 96 Civilian employees (as of 2004)
- Agency executive: Colonel Nathan A. Fulk, Colonel
- Parent agency: Iowa Department of Public Safety

Facilities
- Districts: Post 16

Website
- https://dps.iowa.gov/divisions/iowa-state-patrol

The Iowa State Patrol (ISP) is the state patrol organization in the state of Iowa. Currently, there are just over 267 officers in the patrol, roughly 183 troopers short of their authorized strength of 455. The State is broken into 16 Districts. Their primary concern is enforcing motor vehicle laws, but they also assist with other incidents. These incidents include riots, prison disturbances, labor related disturbances, and providing security at sporting events. The Iowa State Patrol falls under the jurisdiction of the Iowa Department of Public Safety, which also runs the Iowa Division of Criminal Investigation, also known as DCI.

== History ==
The State Patrol was created in 1935 as the Iowa Highway Safety Patrol after an act creating the Patrol was passed by the legislature and signed by the Governor. More than 3,000 men applied for the role, but only 50 men got the job. They got paid $100 a month and had to buy their own ammunition. On July 28, 1935, they officially began patrolling the highways. Later that same year, the word Safety was dropped from the name, and the unit became known simply as the Iowa Highway Patrol. In 1972, the word "Patrolman" was replaced with "Trooper", and in 1975, the name had changed again to reflect the change that Iowans felt was needed; the Iowa Highway Patrol became known as the Iowa State Patrol. The change was quickly reflected by the difference in the uniform shoulder patches, and by the wording of the logos on the car doors.

On April 28, 1936, Oran H. Pape became the first Iowa State Trooper to die in the line of duty and was the first member of the Patrol to be murdered in the line of duty. Pape died after being taken hostage along Highway 61 in Muscatine County. Pape pulled over a stolen vehicle and was forced to get into the vehicle after being held at gunpoint. A struggle ensued which resulted in Pape being shot in the abdomen.

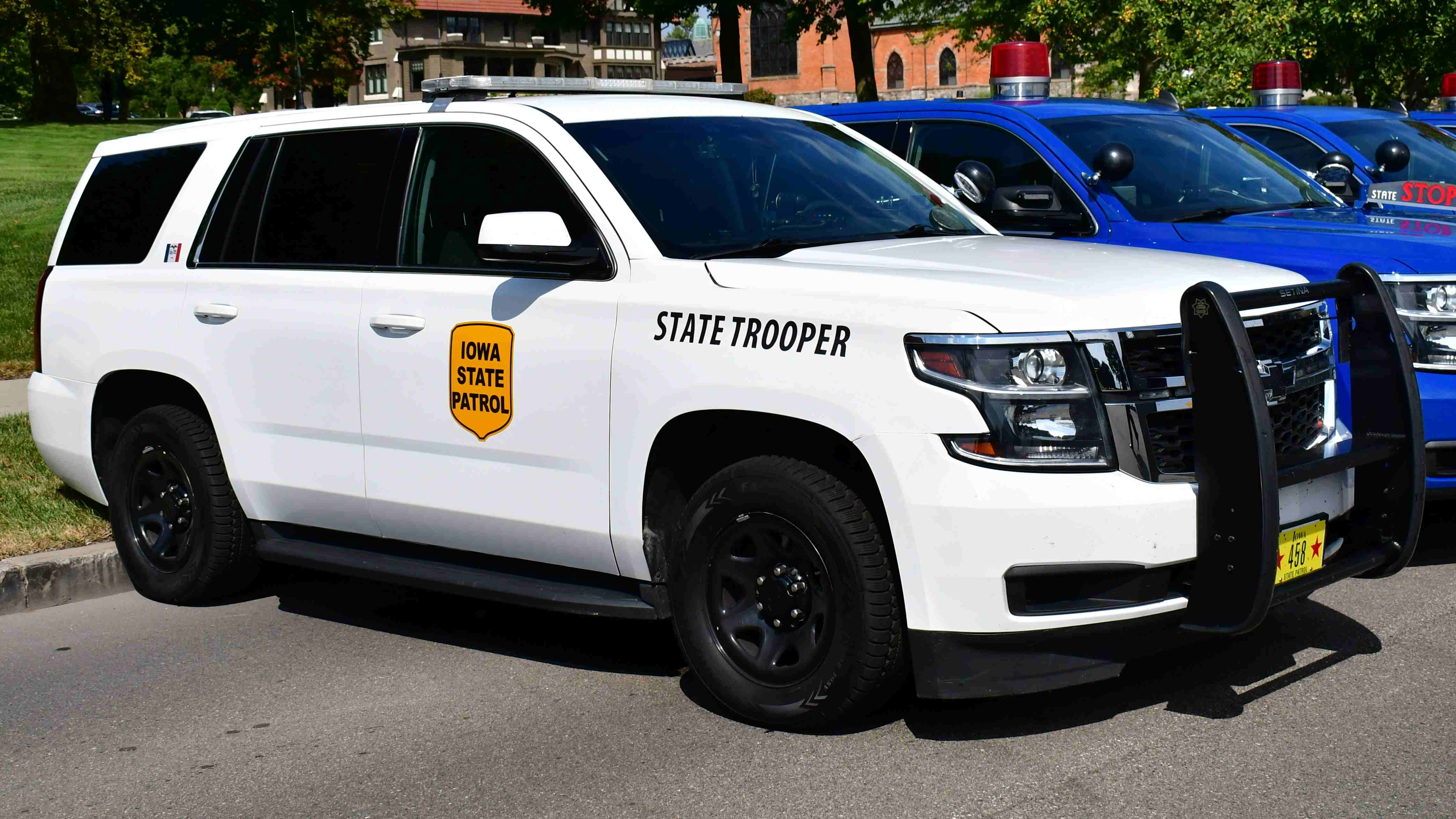
Chevrolet Tahoe of the Iowa State Patrol

In the early days of the Patrol, cars were painted black, with the State Patrol logo on the front doors. In the 1970s, the cars were repainted white, with the logo on the front doors. By the early 1980s, Patrol vehicles had a light tan color with the Iowa State Patrol logo on the sides of the vehicle. In 1998, the Patrol switched to a black and gold color scheme on their vehicles. Blue warning lights began to appear on vehicles beginning in 1999, also. The vehicle color scheme change was not particularly well received, however, with some critics feeling that the new color scheme had turned Patrol cars into moving advertisements for the University of Iowa's Hawkeye sports teams. The Patrol later switched back to the prior color scheme in 2001; however, the 2007 and newer patrol vehicles have been predominantly colored silver or white. The Patrol has mainly used the Ford Crown Victoria Police Interceptor for a number of years. Prior to Chevrolet eliminating the model, Caprices were used as well quite extensively. Recently the Patrol has begun using the Dodge Charger (LX) Police Pursuit Version as well. For a short time, the Patrol also had motorcycle officers until the early 1980s due to the neglect, and later, lack of interest of a motorcycle division within the Patrol. The Patrol also uses several small airplanes for use as air traffic patrol, and to locate suspects fleeing on foot, into the wooded areas, and farm fields of rural Iowa.

== Rank ==
Title	Insignia
Colonel	
Major	
Captain	
Lieutenant	
Sergeant	
Trooper III (Senior Trooper)	
Trooper II	
Trooper I (Capitol/Post 16)	
Peace Officer Candidate (Capitol/Post 16)	

Another symbol of an ISP member's rank is the color of braids they wear on their hat. Trooper III: silver braids Sergeant: silver and black braids Lieutenant: gold braids

== Iowa Capitol Police/District 16 ==
In the year 2000, the Iowa Capitol Police Division was placed into the Iowa State Patrol and became District 16. District 16 maintains a highly visible security presence on the 167-acre (0.68 km^{2}) Capitol Complex in Des Moines and the 6.5-acre (26,000 m^{2}) Terrace Hill Governor's Residence, the official residence of the governor of Iowa.

== See also ==
- List of law enforcement agencies in Iowa
- State police
- State patrol
- Highway patrol
