= Joppa =

Joppa (a latinization of the 4th century Greek name, Ἰόππη) appears in the Bible as the name of the Israelite city of Jaffa.

Joppa may also refer to:

== Biology ==
- Joppa (wasp), a genus of parasitoid wasp in the family Ichneumonidae

== Places ==
=== United Kingdom ===
- Joppa, Edinburgh, in the eastern suburbs of Edinburgh, Scotland
- Joppa, Ayrshire, on the outskirts of Ayr, Scotland
- Joppa, Cornwall, a location in Cornwall, England
- Joppa, Wales, a hamlet in Ceredigion, Wales

=== United States ===
- Joppa, Alabama
- Joppa, Illinois
- Joppa, Kentucky
- Joppa, Maryland
  - Joppa Road
- Joppa Flats, a tidal marsh in Newburyport, Massachusetts
- Joppa, Tennessee, in the Great Smoky Mountains foothills of Grainger County
- Joppa, Texas
- Joppa, West Virginia

=== Australia ===
- Joppa Junction is a junction on the Sydney–Melbourne railway line near Yarra railway station.

== See also ==
- Joppe (disambiguation)
