= Lake Victor, Texas =

- Unincorporated community
- Location within Texas Location within the United States
- Coordinates: 30°54′33″N 98°11′36″W
- Country: United States
- State: Texas
- County: Burnet
- Elevation: 1,391 ft (424 m)
- Time zone: UTC-6 (Central (CST))
  - Summer (DST): UTC-5 (CDT)
- Area codes: 512 & 737
- GNIS feature ID: 1360861

Lake Victor is an unincorporated community in Burnet County, Texas, United States. According to the Handbook of Texas, the community had an estimated population of 215 in 2000.

== History ==
IA post office was established at Lake Victor that same year and remained in operation until 1957 when the community received mail service from Lampasas. Frank A. Ramsey served as the first postmaster. Its population grew to 350 in 1966, dropped to 300 in 1968, returned to 200 in 1972, and ended at 215 from the 1980s through 2000.

Lake Victor also has a Masonic lodge, established in December 1909.

== Geography ==
Lake Victor is located on Farm to Market Road 2340, 10 mi (16 km) north of Burnet in north-central Burnet County.

=== Climate ===
The climate in this area is characterized by hot, humid summers and generally mild to cool winters. According to the Köppen Climate Classification system, Lake Victor has a humid subtropical climate, abbreviated "Cfa" on climate maps.

== Education ==
Lake Victor had its own school in 1903. It became a part of the Burnet Consolidated Independent School District in 1947.
