= Naruna, Texas =

- Unincorporated community
- Location within Texas Location within the United States
- Coordinates: 30°59′20″N 98°19′3″W
- Country: United States
- State: Texas
- County: Burnet
- Elevation: 1,463 ft (446 m)
- Time zone: UTC-6 (Central (CST))
  - Summer (DST): UTC-5 (CDT)
- Area codes: 512 & 737
- GNIS feature ID: 1380233

Naruna is an unincorporated community in Burnet County, Texas, United States. According to the Handbook of Texas, the community had an estimated population of 45 in 2000.

== Geography ==
Naruna is located on Farm to Market Road 1478, 18 mi (29 km) northwest of Burnet in northwestern Burnet County. It is three miles south of the Lampasas County border.

== Education ==
Naruna had its own school in 1884. It joined the Lampasas Independent School District in 1944. Today, Naruna is served by the Burnet Consolidated Independent School District.
