= Watson, Texas =

- Unincorporated community
- Location within Texas Location within the United States
- Coordinates: 30°56′4″N 98°0′52″W
- Country: United States
- State: Texas
- County: Burnet
- Elevation: 1,066 ft (325 m)
- Time zone: UTC-6 (Central (CST))
  - Summer (DST): UTC-5 (CDT)
- Area codes: 512 & 737
- GNIS feature ID: 1380747

Watson is an unincorporated community in Burnet County, Texas, United States. According to the Handbook of Texas, the community had an estimated population of 98 in 2000.

== History ==
The area in what is known as Watson today was named for local storeowner Ed Watson. Its population was 98 in 2000.

== Geography ==
Watson is located at the intersection of Farm to Market Road 963 and U.S. Highway 183, 18 mi (29 km) northeast of Burnet in northeastern Burnet County.

=== Climate ===
The climate in this area is characterized by hot, humid summers and generally mild to cool winters. According to the Köppen Climate Classification system, Watson has a humid subtropical climate, abbreviated "Cfa" on climate maps.

== Education ==
Two schools, established in 1879 and 1908, joined the Briggs school district in the 1930s. Today, Watson is served by the Burnet Consolidated Independent School District.
