= Silver Creek Village, Texas =

- Unincorporated community
- Location within Texas Location within the United States
- Coordinates: 30°51′20″N 98°23′42″W
- Country: United States
- State: Texas
- County: Burnet
- Elevation: 1,027 ft (313 m)
- Time zone: UTC-6 (Central (CST))
  - Summer (DST): UTC-5 (CDT)
- Area codes: 512 & 737
- GNIS feature ID: 2034949

Silver Creek Village is an unincorporated community in Burnet County, Texas, United States. According to the Handbook of Texas, the community had an estimated population of 250 in 2000.

== History ==
The area in what is known as Silver Creek Village today was first settled in 1959 and appeared on maps that next year. There was a Baptist church established in the 1970s. Its population was 250 in 2000 and the community is now a popular tourist destination.

== Geography ==
Silver Creek Village is located off Farm to Market Road 2341 along the shore of Lake Buchanan, 12 mi (19 km) northwest of Burnet in northwestern Burnet County.

== Education ==
Silver Creek Village is served by the Burnet Consolidated Independent School District.
