= Doak Field (American football) =

American football player (born 1958)

No. 50, 57
- Position: Linebacker

Personal information
- Born: October 8, 1958 (age 68); Burnet, Texas, U.S.
- Listed height: 6 ft 2 in (1.88 m)
- Listed weight: 228 lb (103 kg)

Career information
- High school: Burnet
- College: Baylor
- NFL draft: 1981: 7th round, 192nd overall pick

Career history
- Philadelphia Eagles (1981)*; St. Louis Cardinals (1981); Chicago Blitz (1983); Arizona Wranglers (1984); Birmingham Stallions (1985)
- * Offseason or practice squad member only

Awards and highlights
- First-team All-SWC (1980)

Career NFL statistics
- Games played: 7
- Stats at Pro Football Reference

Doak Field (born October 8, 1958) is an American former professional football player who was a linebacker for seven games in the National Football League (NFL) for the St. Louis Cardinals in 1981. He played college football for the Baylor Bears.

== Early life and college career ==
Field grew up in Burnet, Texas, where he played football for Burnet High School. He initially committed to play football for Texas but switched his commitment to Baylor. With Baylor, he won the 1979 Peach Bowl, making an interception late in the game to help secure the win. He played alongside College Football Hall of Fame linebacker Mike Singletary at Baylor; during their senior years in 1980, the Austin American-Statesman speculated that Field may have had the better season despite earning less recognition. Field earned Southwest Conference Defensive Player of the Week honors for an October 1980 game against Houston in which he recorded an interception, a fumble recovery, a blocked field goal, and seventeen tackles.

== Professional career ==
The Philadelphia Eagles selected Field in the seventh round of the 1981 NFL draft. However, the Eagles cut him from the roster before the 1981 season began. The St. Louis Cardinals signed Field in October to replace injured linebacker Tim Kearney. Field played in seven games for the Cardinals, including a November game against the Eagles; he primarily played on special teams. He injured his knee in a December game against the New Orleans Saints and was placed on injured reserve for the remainder of the season. The Cardinals released Field prior to the 1982 season.
