= BMQ =

BMQ may refer to:

- Basic Military Qualification, the recruit training that is undergone to produce non-commissioned members of the Canadian Forces
- The FAA Location Identifier for Burnet Municipal Airport
- British Museum Quarterly, a scholarly journal
