= Cottonwood Shores, Texas =

- City
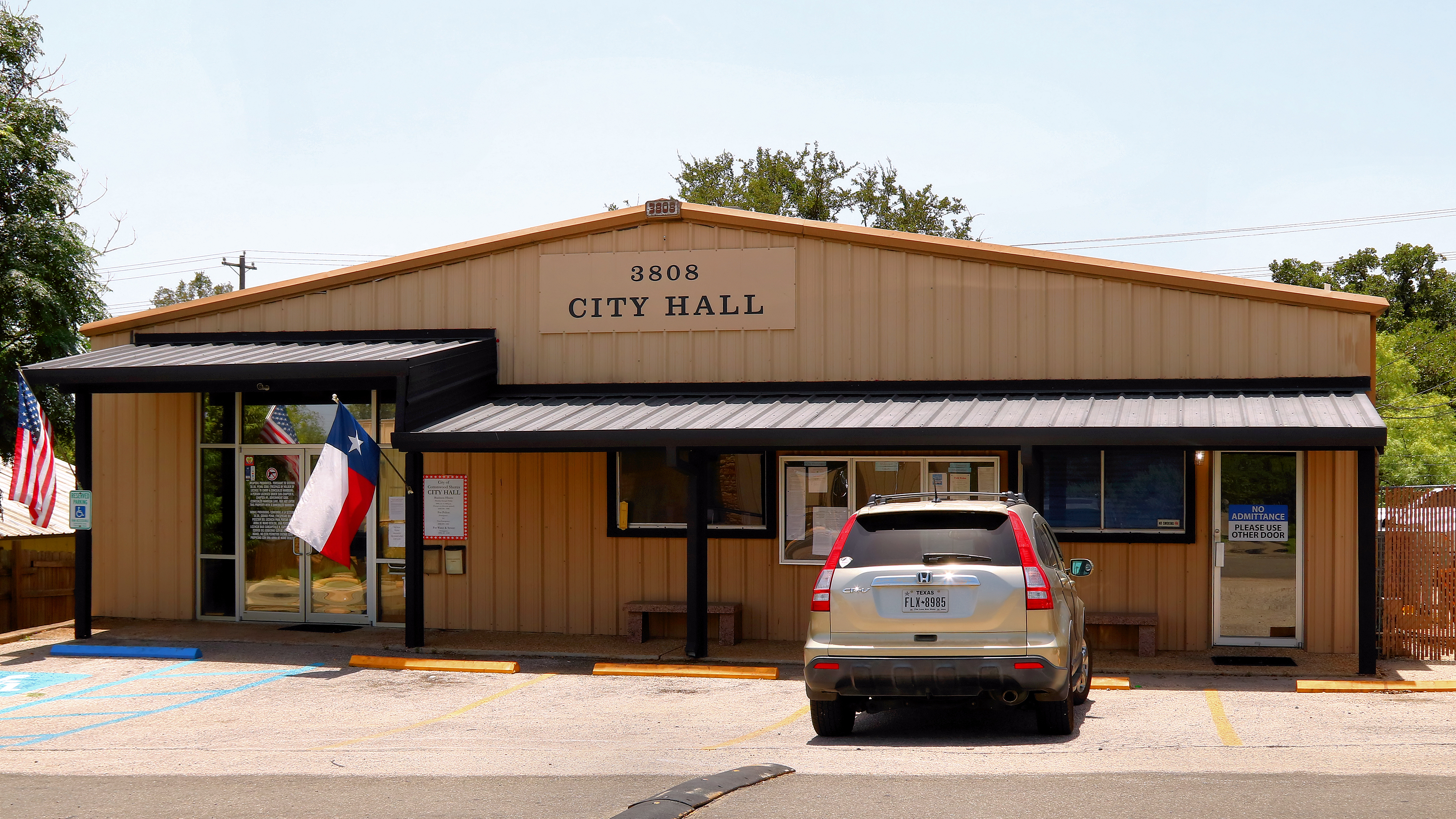
- City Hall
- Motto: "People, Parks, and Prosperity"
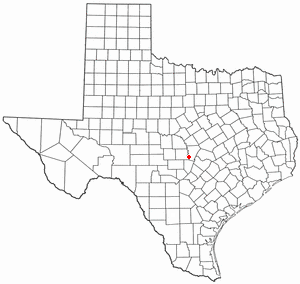
- Location of Cottonwood Shores, Texas

- Coordinates: 30°33′18″N 98°19′39″W
- Country: United States
- State: Texas
- County: Burnet

Area
  - Total: 1.07 sq mi (2.77 km^{2})
  - Land: 1.07 sq mi (2.77 km^{2})
  - Water: 0 sq mi (0.00 km^{2})
- Elevation: 833 ft (254 m)

Population (2020)
  - Total: 1,403
  - Density: 1,310/sq mi (506/km^{2})
- Time zone: UTC-6 (Central (CST))
  - Summer (DST): UTC-5 (CDT)
- ZIP code: 78657
- Area code: 830
- FIPS code: 48-17208
- GNIS feature ID: 2410246
- Website: cottonwoodshores.org

Cottonwood Shores is a city in Burnet County, Texas, United States. The population was 1,403 at the 2020 census.

== Geography ==
Cottonwood Shores is located in southwestern Burnet County on the south bank of the Colorado River below the outlet of Lake Lyndon B. Johnson. This is approximately 4 miles (6 km) southwest of Marble Falls, 17 miles (27 km) southwest of Burnet, the county seat, and 50 miles (80 km) west of downtown Austin.

According to the United States Census Bureau, the city has a total area of 2.0 square miles (5.1 km^{2}), all land.

== Demographics ==
Historical population
Census	Pop.	Note	%±
1990	548		—
2000	877		60.0%
2010	1,123		28.1%
2020	1,403		24.9%
U.S. Decennial Census

=== 2020 census ===
As of the 2020 census, Cottonwood Shores had a population of 1,403 residents living in 491 households, including 264 families. The median age was 35.2 years; 28.9% of residents were under the age of 18 and 11.8% were 65 years of age or older. For every 100 females there were 97.6 males, and for every 100 females age 18 and over there were 99.4 males age 18 and over.

99.4% of residents lived in urban areas, while 0.6% lived in rural areas.

There were 491 households in Cottonwood Shores, of which 41.3% had children under the age of 18 living in them. Of all households, 50.9% were married-couple households, 14.9% were households with a male householder and no spouse or partner present, and 25.1% were households with a female householder and no spouse or partner present. About 20.5% of all households were made up of individuals and 6.5% had someone living alone who was 65 years of age or older.

There were 554 housing units, of which 11.4% were vacant. Among occupied housing units, 75.6% were owner-occupied and 24.4% were renter-occupied. The homeowner vacancy rate was 0.3% and the rental vacancy rate was 10.3%.

Racial composition as of the 2020 census
Race	Number	Percent
White	958	68.3%
Black or African American	27	1.9%
American Indian and Alaska Native	21	1.5%
Asian	10	0.7%
Native Hawaiian and Other Pacific Islander	0	0%
Some other race	133	9.5%
Two or more races	254	18.1%
Hispanic or Latino (of any race)	459	32.7%

=== 2000 census ===
As of the census of 2000, there were 877 people, 312 households, and 232 families residing in the city. The population density was 932.9 inhabitants per square mile (360.2/km^{2}). There were 351 housing units at an average density of 373.4 per square mile (144.2/km^{2}). The racial makeup of the city was 88.60% White, 1.03% African American, 1.25% Native American, 0.11% Asian, 0.23% Pacific Islander, 7.75% from other races, and 1.03% from two or more races. Hispanic or Latino of any race were 19.61% of the population.

There were 312 households, out of which 39.7% had children under the age of 18 living with them, 56.4% were married couples living together, 10.6% had a female householder with no husband present, and 25.6% were non-families. 19.9% of all households were made up of individuals, and 8.3% had someone living alone who was 65 years of age or older. The average household size was 2.81 and the average family size was 3.23.

In the city, the population was spread out, with 30.0% under the age of 18, 8.7% from 18 to 24, 30.8% from 25 to 44, 19.2% from 45 to 64, and 11.4% who were 65 years of age or older. The median age was 34 years. For every 100 females, there were 104.0 males. For every 100 females age 18 and over, there were 102.6 males.

The median income for a household in the city was $36,094, and the median income for a family was $37,656. Males had a median income of $28,333 versus $17,500 for females. The per capita income for the city was $17,664. About 7.6% of families and 9.7% of the population were below the poverty line, including 12.8% of those under age 18 and 3.1% of those age 65 or over.
