= Shovel Mountain, Texas =

- Unincorporated community
- Location within Texas Location within the United States
- Coordinates: 30°28′52″N 98°16′38″W
- Country: United States
- State: Texas
- County: Burnet
- Elevation: 1,073 ft (327 m)
- Time zone: UTC-6 (Central (CST))
  - Summer (DST): UTC-5 (CDT)
- Area codes: 512 & 737
- GNIS feature ID: 1368241

Shovel Mountain is an unincorporated community in Burnet County, Texas, United States. According to the Handbook of Texas, the community had an estimated population of 98 in 2000.

== History ==
Shovel Mountain was first settled in the mid-1850s. Its population was 40 in 1884, 60 in 1890, and 75 in 1892. It then began to decline at the turn of the 20th century. Its population was 98 in 2000.

== Geography ==
Shovel Mountain is located three miles west of U.S. Highway 281, 6 mi (9.7 km) south of Marble Falls in southern Burnet County.

== Education ==
Shovel Mountain has been served by the Marble Falls Independent School District since its school joined the ISD in 1949, and was on county maps during that decade.
