= Double Horn, Texas =

Incorporated US city

Double Horn is an incorporated city in Burnet County, Texas, United States. Until its incorporation in 2019, Double Horn was part of the community of Spicewood.

== Geography ==
Double Horn is located at 30°29′57″N 98°13′15″W. It is situated just north of State Highway 71 in southern Burnet County, approximately four miles west-northwest of Spicewood and five miles southeast of Marble Falls. The nearest major city is Austin, located 26 miles southeast of Double Horn.

=== Climate ===
The climate in this area is characterized by hot, humid summers and generally mild to cool winters. According to the Köppen climate classification, Double Horn has a humid subtropical climate, Cfa on climate maps.

== History ==
The original settlement of Double Horn was established near the headwaters of Double Horn Creek in 1855, with the creek and town named for an incident where a pioneer found the remains of two bucks with interlocked antlers. It had a post office from 1857 to 1911, a school (the Double Horn School), a cotton gin, and two churches. In 1884, the population was 50; by 1896, this population had halved, and by 1936, only the school remained marked on state road maps. Double Horn had completely disappeared from maps as a separate community by the second half of the 20th century. This location is close to a lightly populated ranching area marked on modern topographic maps as Shovel Mountain.

The modern city of Double Horn, centered on the Double Horn subdivision, voted to incorporate in 2018 by a margin of 75-65, as a direct response to neighborhood concerns about the environmental impact of the nearby Spicewood Crushed Stone Quarry. The city's first mayor (Cathy Sereno), a fire marshal, and five aldermen were elected in February 2019. In response to the incorporation, the office of State Attorney General Ken Paxton sued to challenge the validity of the city's status; this lawsuit was originally dismissed in early April 2019, but that dismissal was overturned in 2020 by a Texas Court of Appeals.

== Education ==
Public education in the city of Double Horn is provided by the Marble Falls Independent School District. Zoned campuses include Spicewood Elementary School (kindergarten - grade 5; located in Spicewood), Marble Falls Middle School (grades 6-8), and Marble Falls High School (grades 9-12).

The nearest library is Spicewood Community Library in Spicewood.
