= Joppa, Texas =

- Unincorporated community
- Location within Texas Location within the United States
- Coordinates: 30°49′32″N 98°01′54″W
- Country: United States
- State: Texas
- County: Burnet
- Elevation: 1,093 ft (333 m)
- Time zone: UTC-6 (Central (CST))
  - Summer (DST): UTC-5 (CDT)
- Area codes: 512 & 737
- GNIS feature ID: 1380012

Joppa is an unincorporated community located in Burnet County, Texas, United States. According to the Handbook of Texas, the community had a population of 34 in 2000.

== History ==
The community got its start when in 1881, J. S. and Jane Danford of Delaware County, Iowa, donated two acres of land on the north bank of the river for a church. The original settlement name was Pool Branch for a nearby pool of water carved out by a waterfall on the North Fork of the San Gabriel River. By the 1880s, a cotton gin and mill were established, and a store and blacksmith shop soon followed, the only other businesses in the settlement. When a post office was established in 1891, residents submitted the biblical name “Joppa” and the postal service approved it. On May 19, 1904, the first telephone was installed in Joppa, and in 1907, an iron bridge was built across the river. The bridge was washed away during the July 2025 Central Texas Floods. In 1939, the Pedernales Electric Cooperative strung the first transmission line to bring electricity to the area. As late as the 1930s, the community held annual picnics as well as Friday and Saturday night socials and Sunday night singing. All that remains of the pioneer settlement is the church and community center. Its population was 34 in 2000.

== Geography ==
Joppa is located on the North Fork of the San Gabriel River on Farm to Market Road 210, seven miles northeast of Bertram.

== Education ==
A school was built on top of the Danford's land grant. The building was constructed at once. The original school building was converted to a community center after the one-room school consolidated, in 1942, with the Bertram Independent School District and is still in use today. Until 1913, the schoolhouse hosted church services. Today, the community is served by the Burnet Consolidated Independent School District.
