= Burnet Municipal Airport =

Burnet Municipal Airport Kate Craddock Field
- IATA: none; ICAO: KBMQ; FAA LID: BMQ

Summary
- Airport type: Public
- Owner: City of Burnet
- Serves: Burnet, Texas
- Elevation AMSL: 1,283 ft (391 m)
- Coordinates: 30°44′20″N 098°14′19″W
- Website: www.cityofburnet.com/...

Map
- Location within Texas

Runways
Direction	Length		Surface
Direction	ft	m	Surface
1/19	5,000	1,524	Asphalt

Statistics (2023)
- Aircraft operations (year ending 6/8/2023): 21,000
- Based aircraft: 48
- Source: Federal Aviation Administration

Burnet Municipal Airport (ICAO: KBMQ, FAA LID: BMQ), also known as Kate Craddock Field, is a city-owned public-use airport located one nautical mile (1.85 km) southwest of the central business district of Burnet, a city in Burnet County, Texas, United States.

Although most U.S. airports use the same three-letter location identifier for the FAA and IATA, this airport is assigned BMQ by the FAA but has no designation from the IATA (which assigned BMQ to Bamburi, Kenya).

== Facilities and aircraft ==
Burnet Municipal Airport covers an area of 143 acres (58 ha) at an elevation of 1,283 feet (391 m) above mean sea level. It has one asphalt paved runway designated 1/19 which measures 5,001 by 75 feet (1,524 x 23 m).

The lighted runway, with a full length taxiway, has two instrument approaches and can accommodate aircraft with up to 30,000 pounds (14,000 kg) per wheel. Faulkner's Air Shop is the fixed-base operator (FBO). Avgas and jet fuel are available.

For the 12-month period ending June 8, 2023, the airport had 21,000 aircraft operations, an average of 57 per day: 97% general aviation and 3% military. At that time, there were 48 aircraft based at this airport: 42 single-engine, 3 multi-engine, 1 jet, and 2 helicopter.

== Accidents and incidents ==
- On July 21, 2018, a Douglas C-47B N47HL of the Commemorative Air Force crashed on take-off and was destroyed by fire. All thirteen people on board survived.

== See also ==
- List of airports in Texas
