= Fort Croghan =

- Historical Park Site
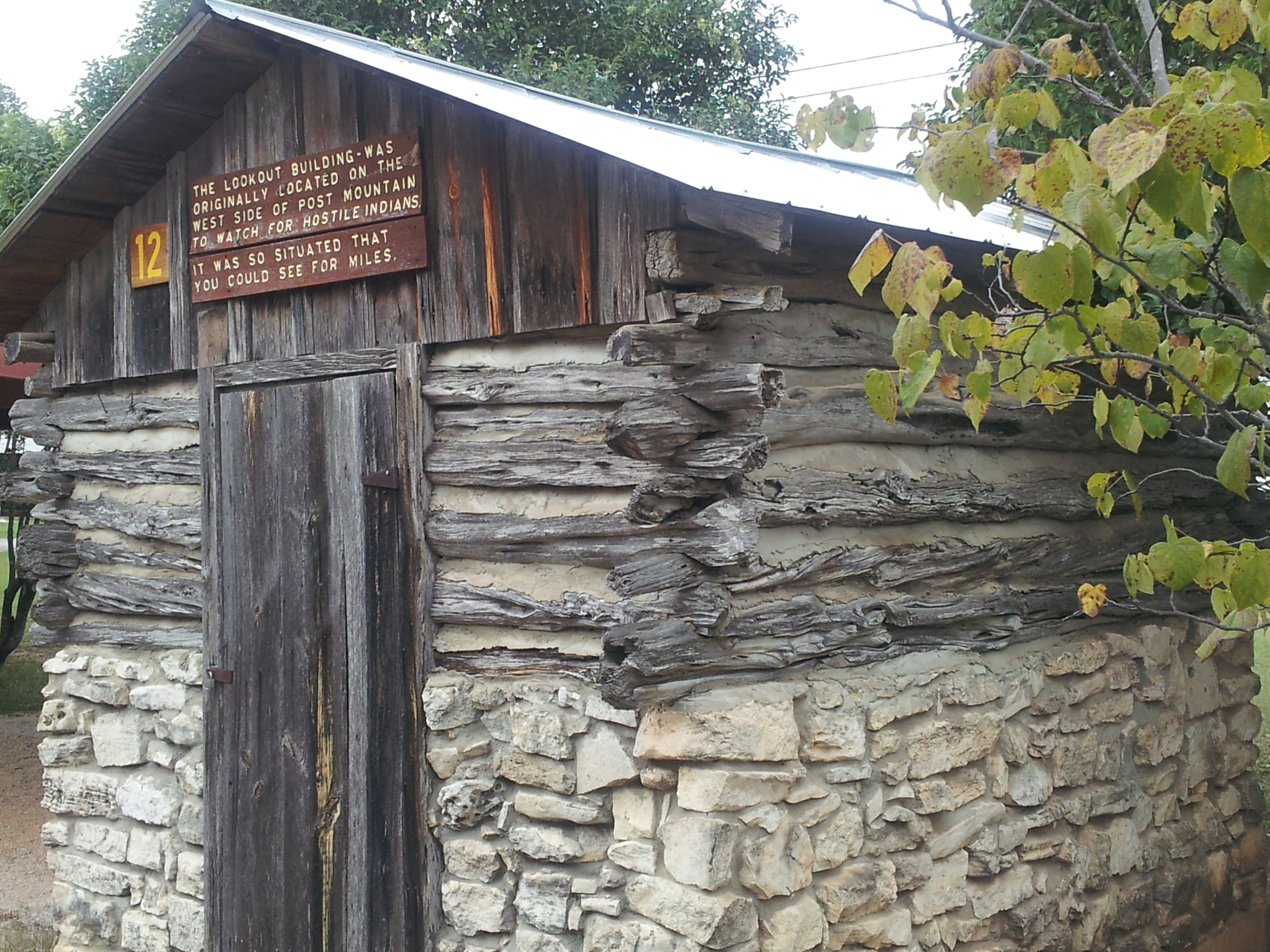
- Fort Croghan Outpost

- Location within Texas
- Coordinates: 30°45′25″N 98°14′15″W
- Country: United States
- State: Texas
- County: Burnet
- U.S. Army Fort: March 13, 1849
- Elevation: 1,329 ft (405 m)
- Time zone: UTC-6 (Central (CST))
  - Summer (DST): UTC-5 (MDT)
- GNIS feature ID: 1357583

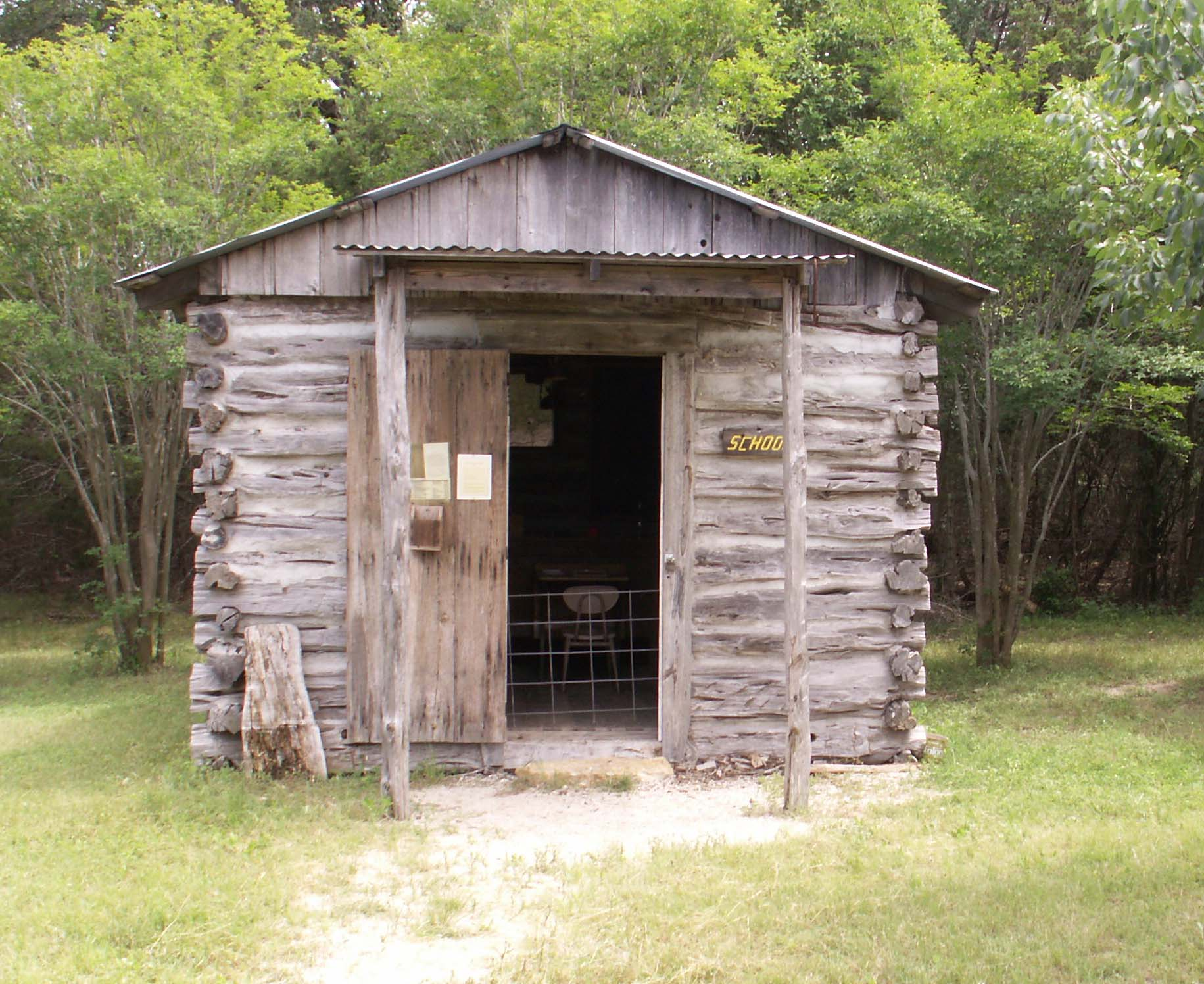
One room school house now located at Ft. Croghan.

Fort Croghan was the third of the first four forts established by the United States government to protect settlers from hostile Indians along the Texas frontier. From its establishment on March 18, 1849, by Lt. C.H. Taylor (Company A, Second Dragoons) until it was abandoned in 1855, Fort Croghan was home to Company C, 8th Infantry, U.S.A. (mounted), and eventually became the headquarters of the Second Dragoon Regiment.

Part of a chain of forts extending from Fort Worth to Fort Inge near present-day Uvalde, the fort was named for Colonel George Croghan. The fort originally covered some 50 acres (20 ha) near the present-day city of Burnet, Texas, extending from Hamilton Creek up and over Post Mountain. Today, a small section exists due to the efforts of the Burnet County Historical Society, which raised money in the 1960s to purchase this portion of the old fort.

== Early history ==
In the 1840s, upon the annexation of Texas to the United States, the federal government became responsible for the protection of frontier settlers from Indian raids. Several companies of Texas Rangers, financed by the federal government, were stationed along the frontier. In December 1847, a company of Rangers under the command of Henry Eustace McCulloch took up a position about 3 miles (5 km) south of present-day Burnet. Samuel E. Holland purchased a 1,280-acre (5.2 km^{2}) grant there in 1848, including the land on which the Ranger station was located. His residence built on that land is said to have been the first permanent home in Burnet County. The indigenous peoples of the Americas had occupied this region for thousands of years, but did not build or live in permanent homes, theirs being a migratory culture.

In the late 1840s, the lure of free and cheap land had thrust many settlers far beyond the protection of civilization. More and more settlers arrived, many of them from foreign countries. Some came expecting to acquire good farmland near the Texas coast. They soon learned that they would have to move hundreds of miles inland and the only land left was marginal rangeland. Indians who had been peaceful due to treaties and the presence of the United States soldiers during the U.S.-Mexican War now began to come into conflict with these newcomers. The Comanche and Apache were particularly incensed at this intrusion into their ancient hunting grounds.

At first, the government wanted to build Fort Croghan near Holland Springs. Burnet County's first white resident, Sam Holland, objected strenuously to a military post being located near his home. They then decided to locate the fort a few miles north on Hamilton Creek. No consideration was more important than a year-round source of abundant, clean water, needed for many uses and as drinking water for people and animals.

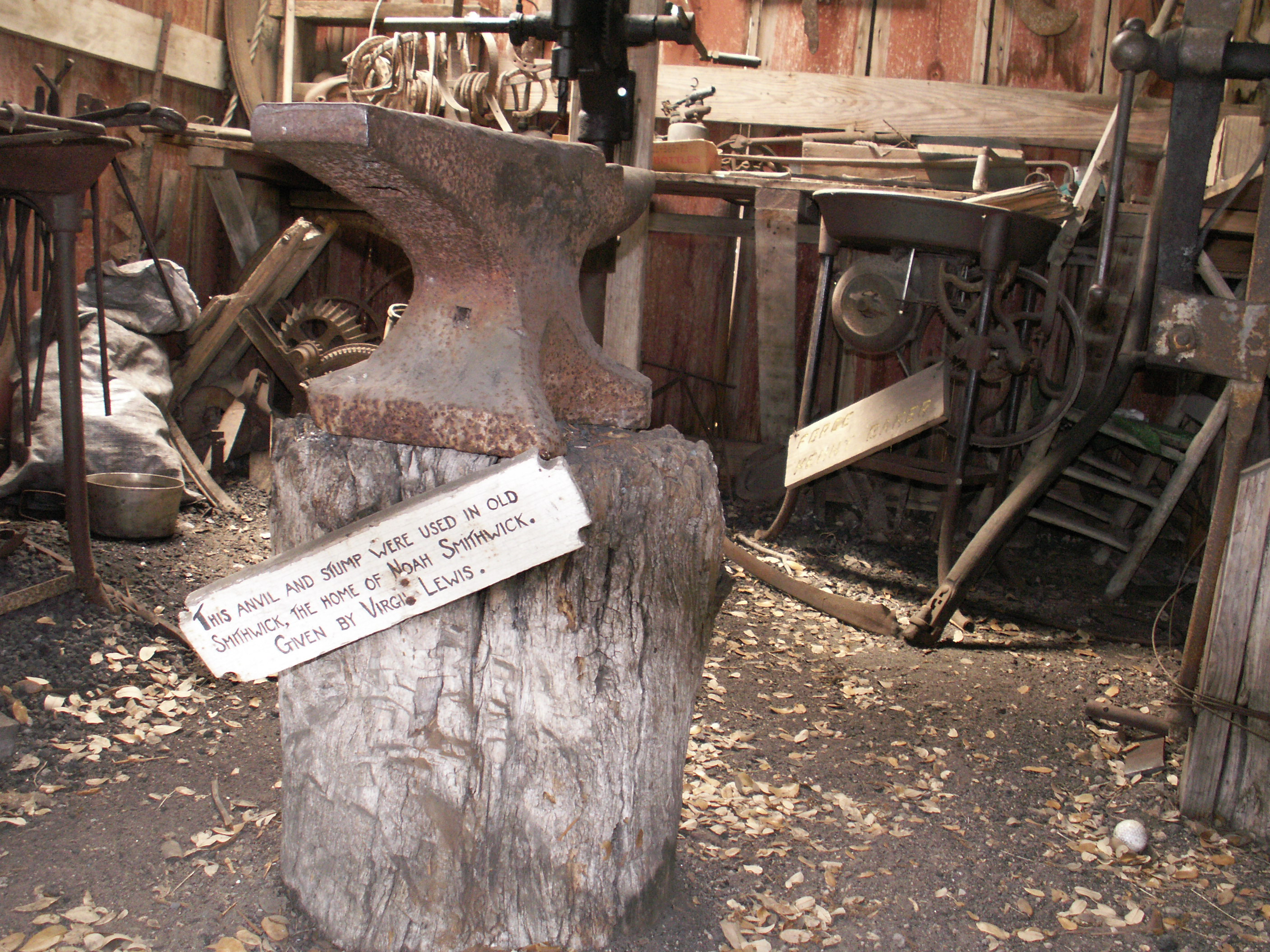
Anvil and stump from Smithwick Mills, home of Noah Smithwick, early fort blacksmith

All the necessary buildings, including a hospital, bakery, officers' quarters, enlisted men's huts, powderhouse, horse and mule lots, blacksmith shop, storage buildings, and a lookout building on top of Post Mountain, were constructed by the soldiers. In October 1849, Company C. 8th Infantry, U.S.A. Mounted arrived to occupy this newly constructed fort.

Fort Croghan consisted of the usual log cabins enclosed by a strong stockade. It was manned by one company of cavalry and one of infantry. The first commander was Captain Phillip St. George Cook. Captain Cook soon resigned his position and was followed by Captains Blake, Lee, and Sibley. Some of the soldiers settled in the area and stayed on after the fort was decommissioned. Christian Dorbandt, later sheriff of Burnet County, was one of these men. Noah Smithwick worked as an armorer for the fort.

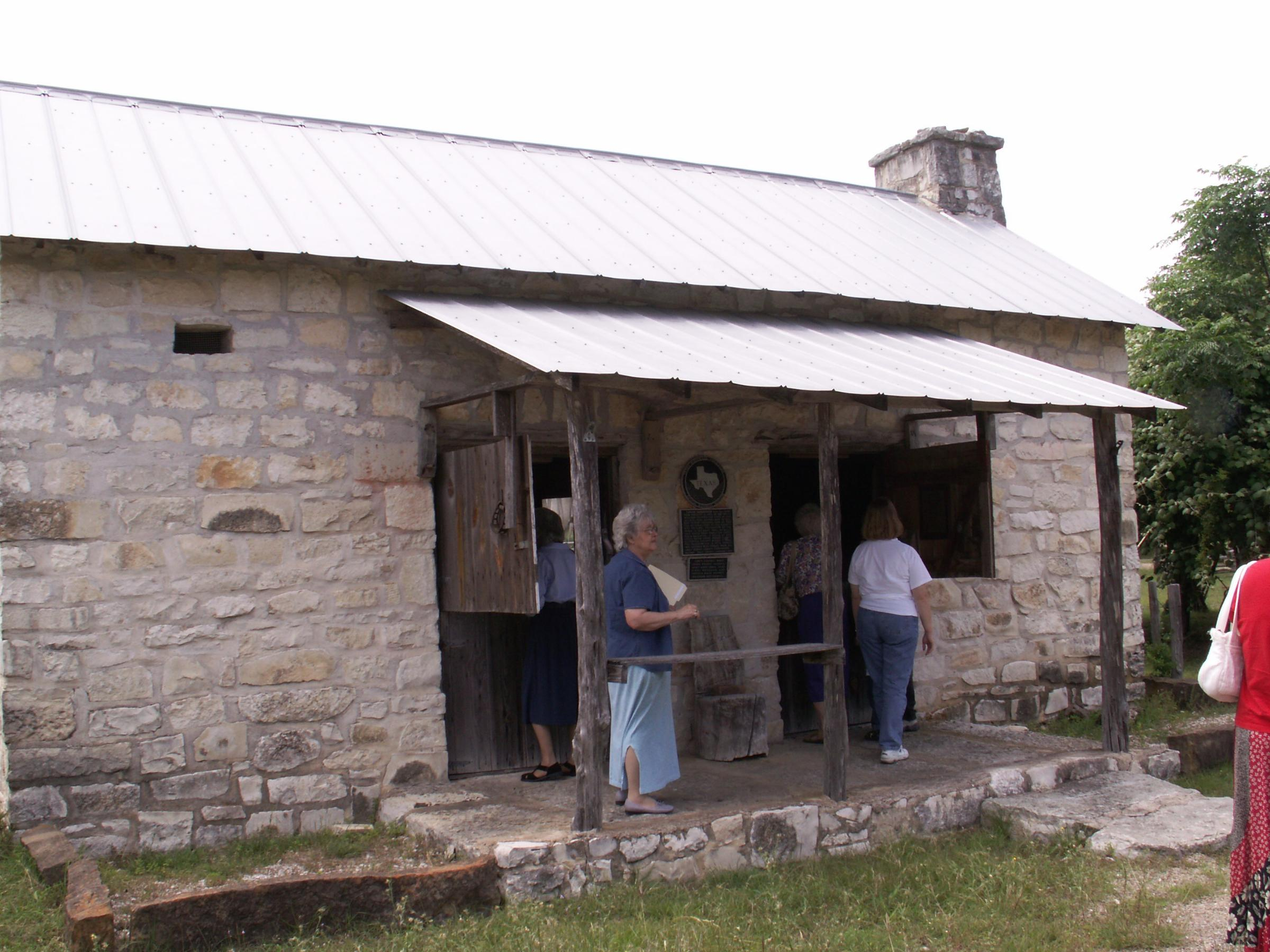
House built by Logan Vandeveer for his father, William.

A small town soon grew up across Hamilton Creek, as merchants and other suppliers of services moved to be near the fort. Logan Vandeveer and Peter Kerr were among the first to obtain contracts to furnish the fort with beef and other foodstuffs. In 1852, Vandeveer was instrumental in petitioning the Texas Legislature to authorize the creation of Burnet County. The town was first called Hamilton or Hamilton Valley, but in 1858, the town name was changed to Burnet, also.

Fort Croghan was abandoned in December 1853, having served its purpose. The last building there was demolished in the 1920s and the old fort was forgotten as the town grew and prospered.

== Fort Croghan Restoration ==
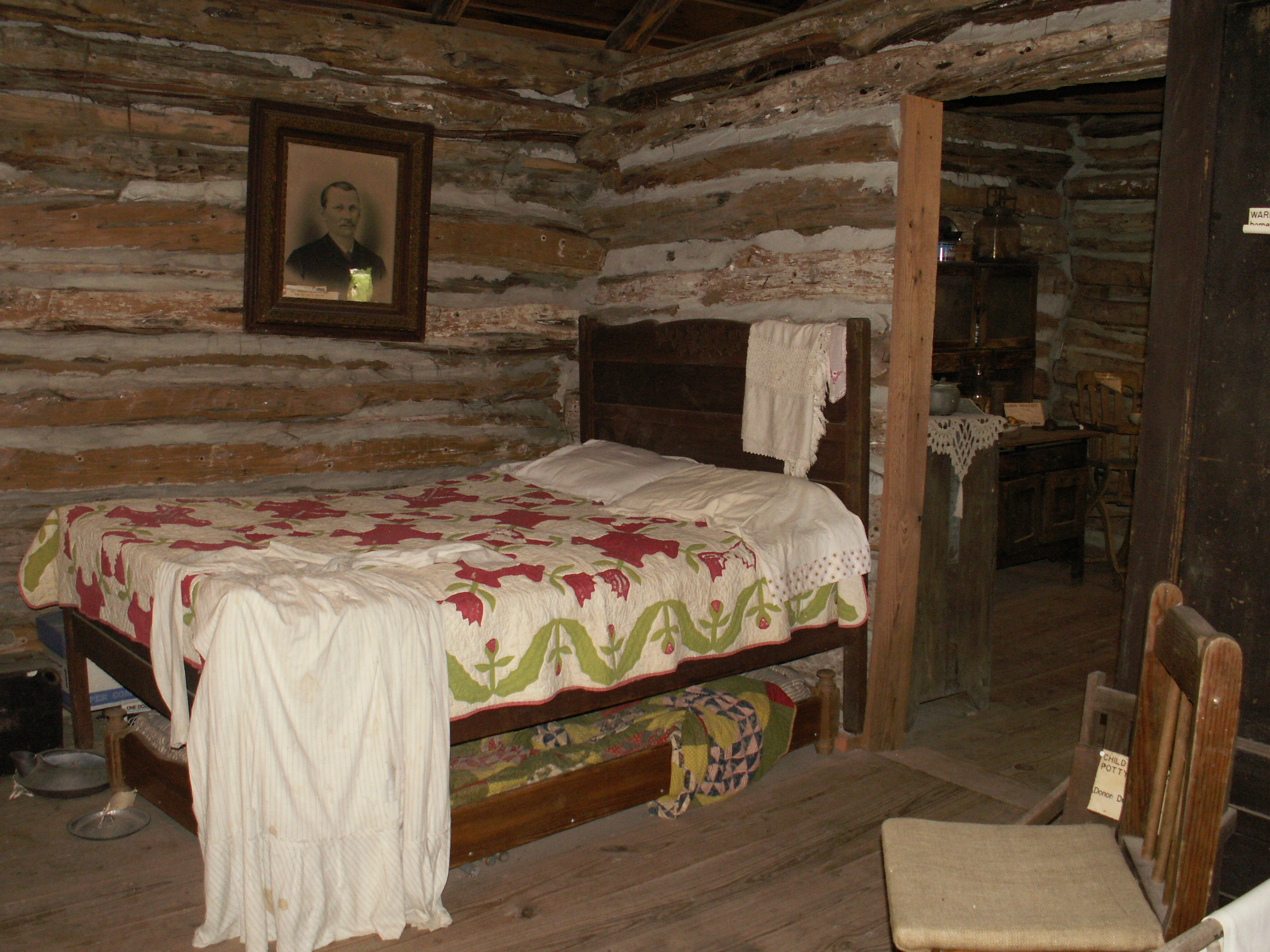
Cabin interior, note the trundle bed.

In the 1960s, a group of citizens interested in preserving this part of Burnet County and the city of Burnet's past formed the Burnet County Historical Society and raised the money to purchase the present-day grounds. Early presidents of the Burnet County Historical Society included Rethie Dorbandt, Ed Young, Virgil Lewis, Tad Moses, Jimsey Husted, Phyllis Adrian, Reta Ross, Clyde Mather, Mrs. T.D. Bryant, W.C. Galloway, Mather Dorbandt, and Donald Duncan. Local landowners donated the historical cabins that were moved to the fort grounds and reassembled as they had been. The Texas Rangers' McCulloch's Station was 4 miles south on Hamilton Creek.

== Fort Croghan Grounds and Museum ==
The Fort Croghan Museum features historical artifacts including tools, household items, and Western gear. The grounds contain restored buildings with period displays, including a stage-stop house, blacksmith shop, schoolhouse, powder house, several late 19th-century cabins, a lookout house, and a syrup-making shop. Fort Croghan Day is held each year to demonstrate frontier life.

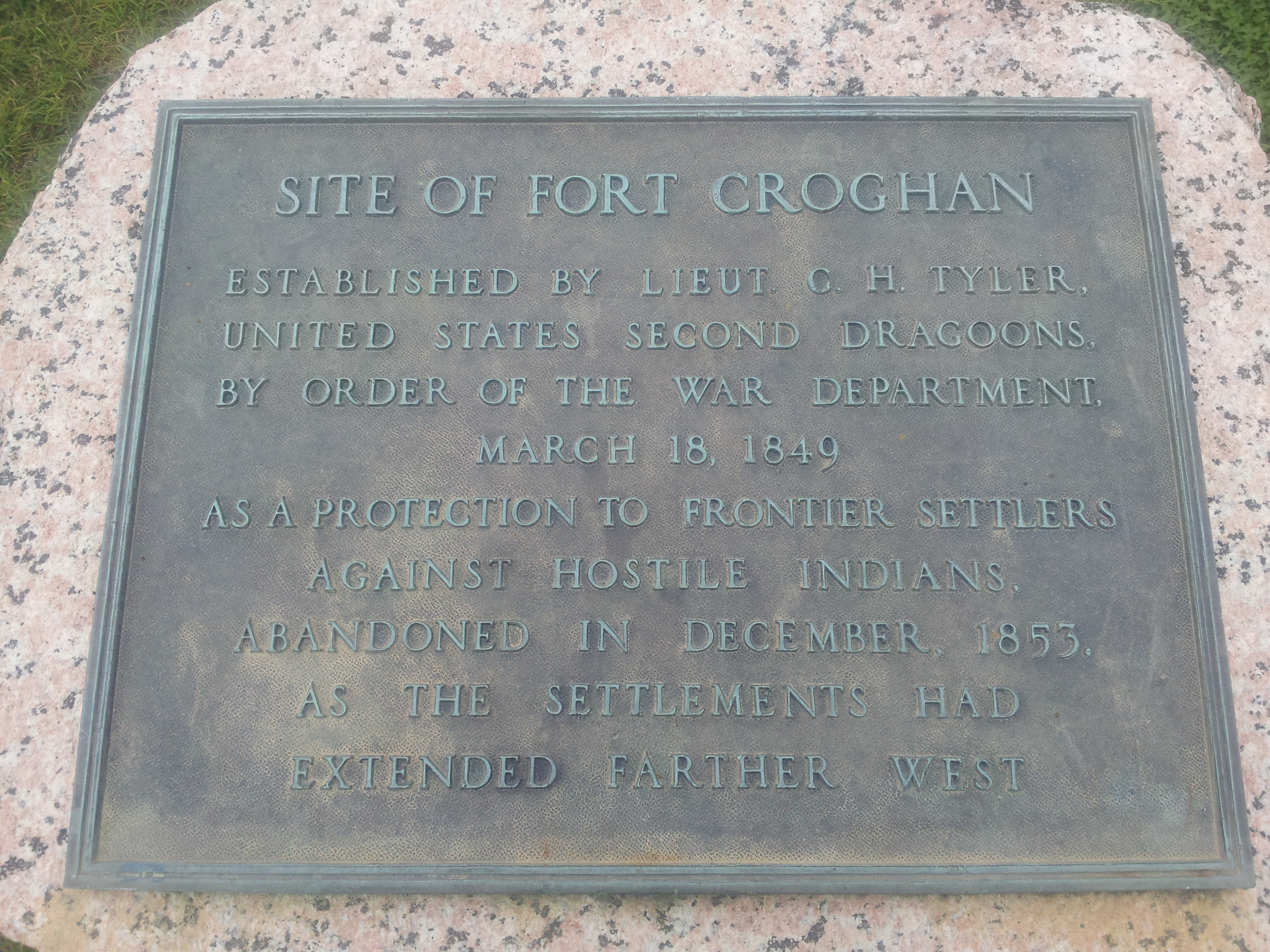
Fort Croghan Historical Marker

== See also ==
- Fort Gates
- Fort Graham
- Fort Martin Scott
- Fort Duncan
