= Floyd Iglehart =

American football player (1934–1987)

No. 49
- Position: Halfback

Personal information
- Born: January 25, 1934; Terrell, Texas, U.S.
- Died: September 5, 1987 (aged 53); Dallas, Texas, U.S.
- Listed height: 6 ft 4 in (1.93 m)
- Listed weight: 197 lb (89 kg)

Career information
- High school: Burnet (TX)
- College: Wiley
- NFL draft: 1958: 6th round, 67th overall pick

Career history
- Los Angeles Rams (1958)
- Stats at Pro Football Reference

Floyd Iglehart (January 25, 1934 – September 5, 1987) was an American football halfback. He played for the Los Angeles Rams in 1958. He was drafted in the sixth round of the 1958 NFL Draft by the Rams.

He shot and killed himself on September 5, 1987, in Dallas, Texas at age 53.
