= Noah Smithwick =

Texas settler and gunsmith (1808–1899)

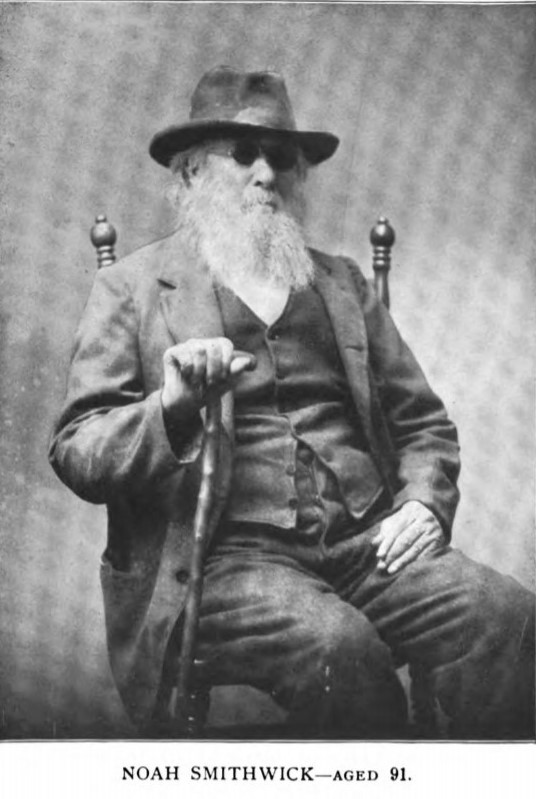
Noah Smithwick

Noah Smithwick (January 01, 1808 – October 21, 1899) was a colonist who lived in Texas from 1827 and until the Civil War began. A gunsmith and blacksmith, he fought in the Texas Revolution and served as a Texas Ranger. Late in life he dictated his recollections of this early Texas period to his daughter, relaying colorful and humorous accounts, which included legendary Texans Stephen F. Austin, James Bowie, William B. Travis, Thomas Jefferson Rusk, and Sam Houston, who he knew personally.

Smithwick was born and educated in North Carolina. He worked as blacksmith in Kentucky and in 1827 went to Texas and settled in San Felipe, Texas. He applied for land in Stephen F. Austin's colony but never located it. In 1830 he helped a friend accused of murder escape. For this Smithwick was banished from Texas. After staying in East Texas and Louisiana, he returned to Texas in 1835 at the beginning of the Texas Revolution and took part in the Battle of Concepcion.

In 1836 he joined a ranger company to defend the Bastrop area from Indians, then went to San Jacinto arriving after the battle. From 1836 to 1838 Smithwick served at Fort Colorado, AKA Fort Coleman, in what is today Travis County. In 1837 a band of Penateka Comanche (Nʉmʉnʉʉ) approached Fort Colorado to seek a treaty of peace. Smithwick lived with the Comanches as emissary for many months where he “was made the recipient of every attention known to their code of hospitality”. This is the only known peace treaty ever initiated from inside Travis County. The treaty was unfortunately never ratified by Texas.

He married Thurza N. Blakey in 1839 and settled in Webber's Prairie in Travis County. In 1850 he moved to Brushy Creek in Williamson County.

In 1849 Smithwick went to Fort Croghan in Burnet County and served as the fort's first armorer. In 1853 he bought and ran a nearby saw and grist mill. In 1857 he bought a mill and established Smithwick Mills and a post office of that name was established. When Texas voted for secession, Smithwick was opposed. After receiving threats for his Unionist views in 1861, he moved to what is now Kern County, California.

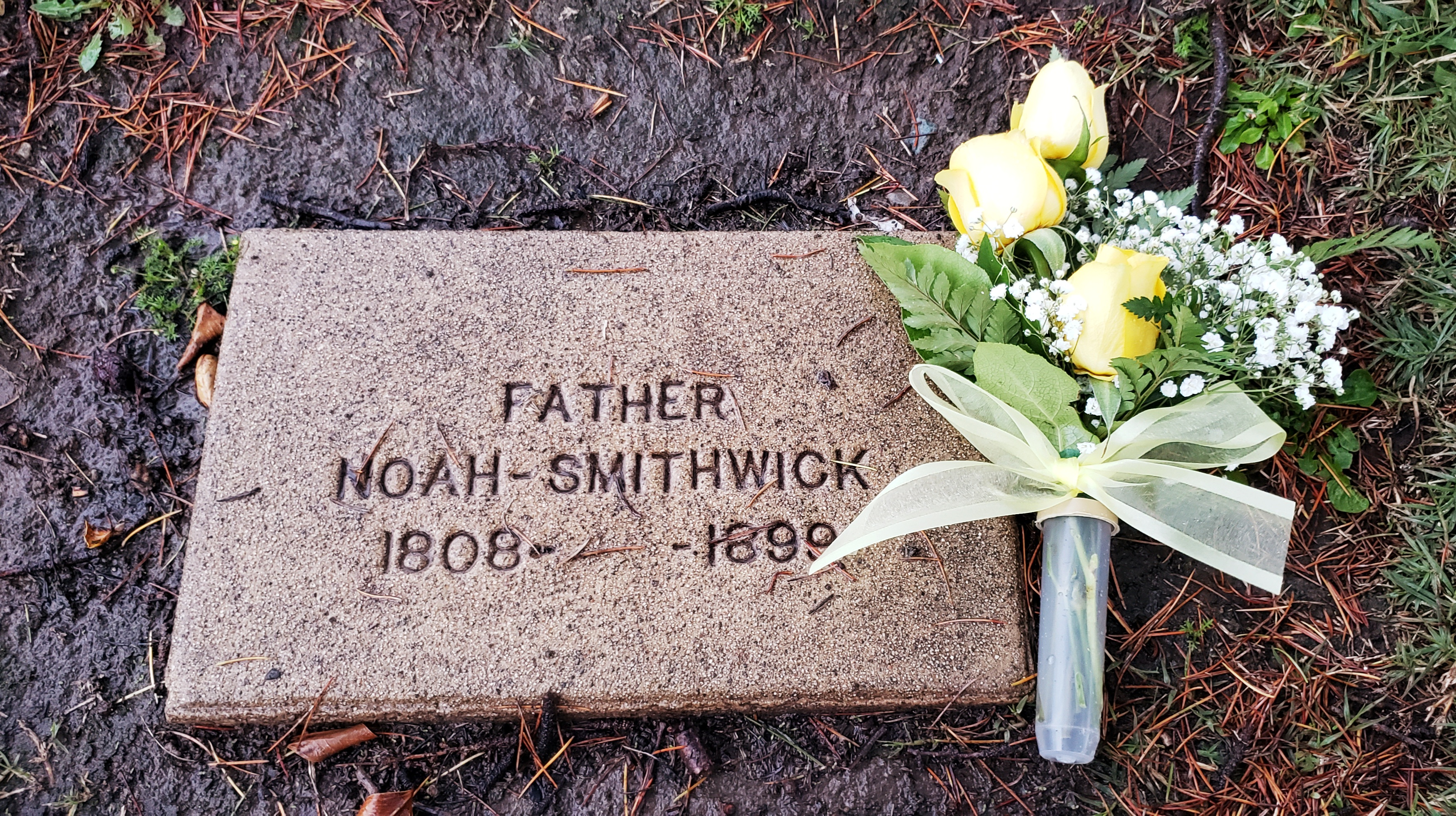
Noah Smithwick's grave in Santa Ana, California.

In his later years he lost his eyesight. Before his death in Santa Ana, California, he dictated accounts of Texas experiences to his daughter, Anna (Nanna) Smithwick Donaldson, which she published. The book, 'The Evolution of a State, or, Recollections of Old Texas Days' has been referenced in numerous books about Texas history.

Smithwick died in October 1899.
