= Joppe =

Joppe may refer to:

- Jaffa, known as Joppa alias Ioppe, an Ancient city and former bishopric, now also
  - Joppe (Roman), Latin Catholic titular see
  - Joppe (Syrian), Syriac Catholic titular see
- Joppe, Gelderland, Netherlands

== See also ==
- Joppa (disambiguation)
