= Burnet High School (Texas) =

Location
- 1000 The Green Mile; Burnet, Texas 78611-0180; United States; 30.7781°N 98.2255°W

Information
- School type: Public high school
- School district: Burnet Consolidated Independent School District
- Principal: Casey Burkhart
- Grades: 9-12
- Enrollment: 985 (2025-2026)
- Colors: Kelly green & white
- Athletics conference: UIL Class 4A
- Mascot: Bulldog
- Yearbook: Bulldog
- Website: Burnet High School

Burnet High School is a public high school located in Burnet, Texas, USA, and classified as a 4A school by the UIL. It is part of the Burnet Consolidated Independent School District located in central Burnet County. For the 2024–2025 school year, the school was given a "B" by the Texas Education Agency.

== Athletics ==
The Burnet Bulldogs compete in these sports -

- Baseball
- Basketball
- Cross country
- American football
- Golf
- Powerlifting
- Soccer
- Softball
- Swimming and diving
- Tennis
- Track and field
- Volleyball

=== State finalists ===
- American football - 1991 (3A), 2002 (3A/D1), 2003 (3A/D1)
- Cross Country - 2020 (4A), 2021 (4A)
- Woman's Basketball - 2019 (4A)

== Fine Arts ==
Burnet High School contain the following fine arts:

- Band
- Choir
- Art
- Dance

== Notable alumni ==
- Floyd Iglehart, former NFL player
- Stephen McGee, former NFL player
- Dudley Meredith, former NFL player
- Jordan Shipley, former NFL player
