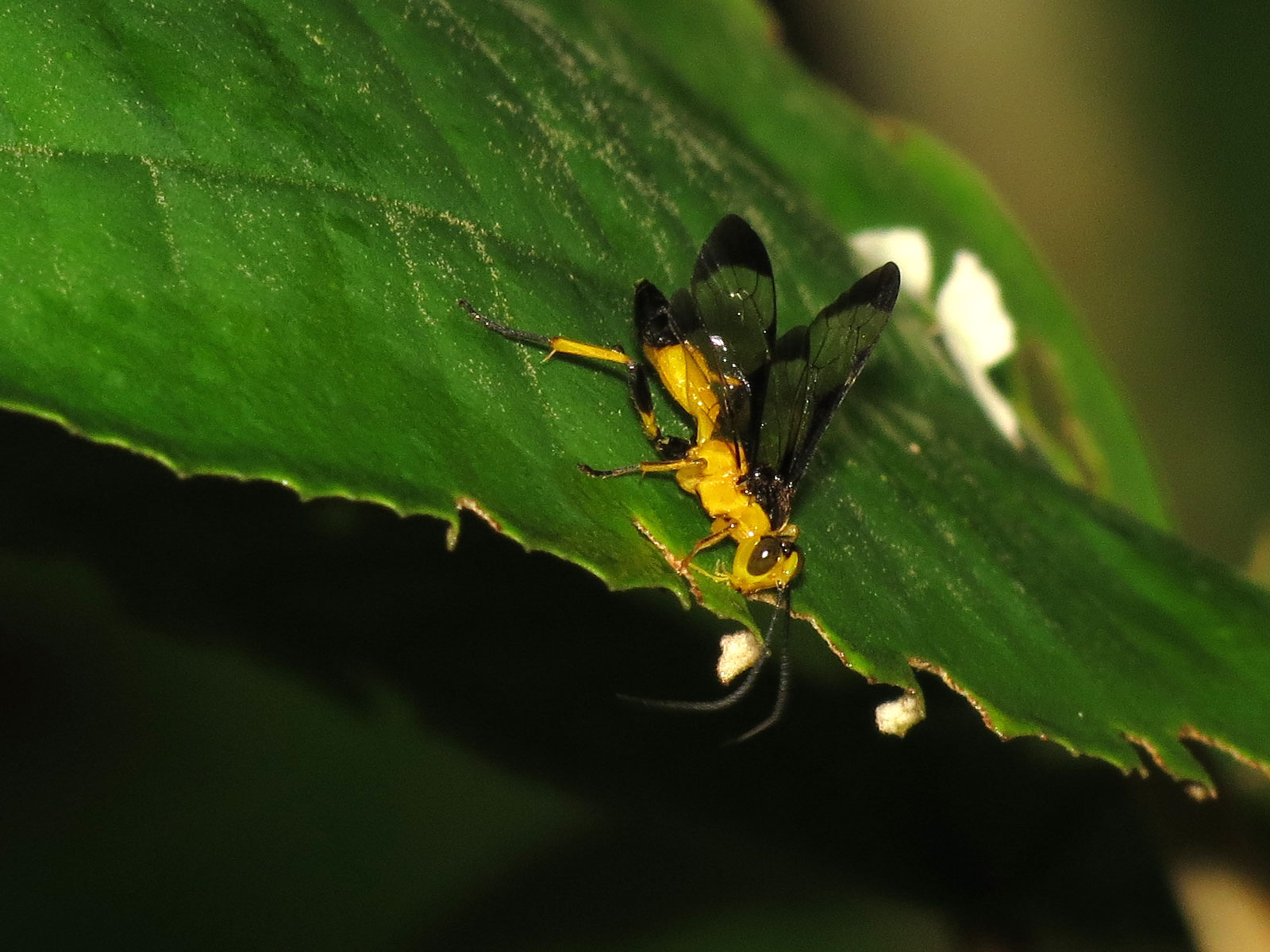
- Joppa sp. photographed in Soberania National Park, Panama

Scientific classification
- Kingdom: Animalia
- Phylum: Arthropoda
- Clade: Pancrustacea
- Class: Insecta
- Order: Hymenoptera
- Family: Ichneumonidae
- Tribe: Ichneumonini
- Genus: Joppa; Fabricius, 1804

= Joppa (wasp) =

Genus of wasps

Joppa is a genus of Neotropical parasitoid wasps in the family Ichneumonidae.

== Selected species ==
The following are examples of species of Joppa:

- Joppa braunsii (Kriechbaumer, 1898)
- Joppa brunnii (Kriechbaumer, 1898)
- Joppa dromedaria (Kriechbaumer, 1898)
- Joppa furcifera Kriechbaumer, 1898
- Joppa fuscata Kriechbaumer, 1898
- Joppa geniculata Cameron, 1884
- Joppa hypoxantha (Kriechbaumer, 1898)
- Joppa linearis (Kriechbaumer, 1898)
- Joppa mesopyrrha (Kriechbaumer, 1898)
- Joppa subvittata (Kriechbaumer, 1898)
- Joppa verticalis Fabricius, 1804
