= Joppa, Cornwall =

Hamlet in Cornwall, England

Coordinates: 50°10′42″N 5°24′42″W

Joppa (from Cornish: Shoppa, meaning "workshop") is a farmstead settlement in Cornwall, England, United Kingdom. It is situated approximately one mile (1.6 km) southeast of Hayle and is in Hayle civil parish.
