= Joppa, West Virginia =

- Unincorporated community
- Location within West Virginia Location within the United States
- Coordinates: 38°46′43″N 80°29′17″W
- Country: United States
- State: West Virginia
- County: Braxton
- Elevation: 1,050 ft (320 m)
- Time zone: UTC-5 (Eastern (EST))
  - Summer (DST): UTC-4 (EDT)
- GNIS feature ID: 1549764

Joppa is an unincorporated community in Braxton County, West Virginia, United States.

The community derives its name from the ancient city of Joppa (Jaffa).
