= Logan Vandeveer =

American soldier, ranger, and civic leader

Logan Vandeveer, 1815 - 1855

Logan Vandeveer was an early Texas Ranger, soldier, pioneer; ranger, cattleman, and civic leader. He was born in Casey County, Kentucky, around 1815. He was the son of William and Emily (Shackleford) Vandeveer. He came to Texas in 1833, joining Stephen F. Austin's Little Colony at Mina in present-day Bastrop County.

== Military career ==
He enlisted in Capt. Jesse Billingsley's company on February 28, 1836. Vandeveer, a private, was badly wounded in the battle of San Jacinto, and was discharged at Mina on June 1, 1836. His name is inscribed at the San Jacinto Monument.

== Ranger, husband, and entrepreneur ==
Logan Vandeveer married Lucinda Mays of Alabama in 1838 or 1839. After his discharge from the army, Vandeveer entered the Texas Rangers and fought Indians throughout the Bastrop area. Receiving tracts of land in what is now Burnet County for his service in the Texas Revolution, he also purchased additional land in the area. In 1849, he secured a contract from the United States government to supply meat and foodstuffs to Fort Croghan and later Fort Mason, 50 miles farther west. The Vandeveers had seven children, and are found on the 1850 Census for Travis County with their four surviving daughters. Lucinda died soon after this.

== Civic Accomplishments ==
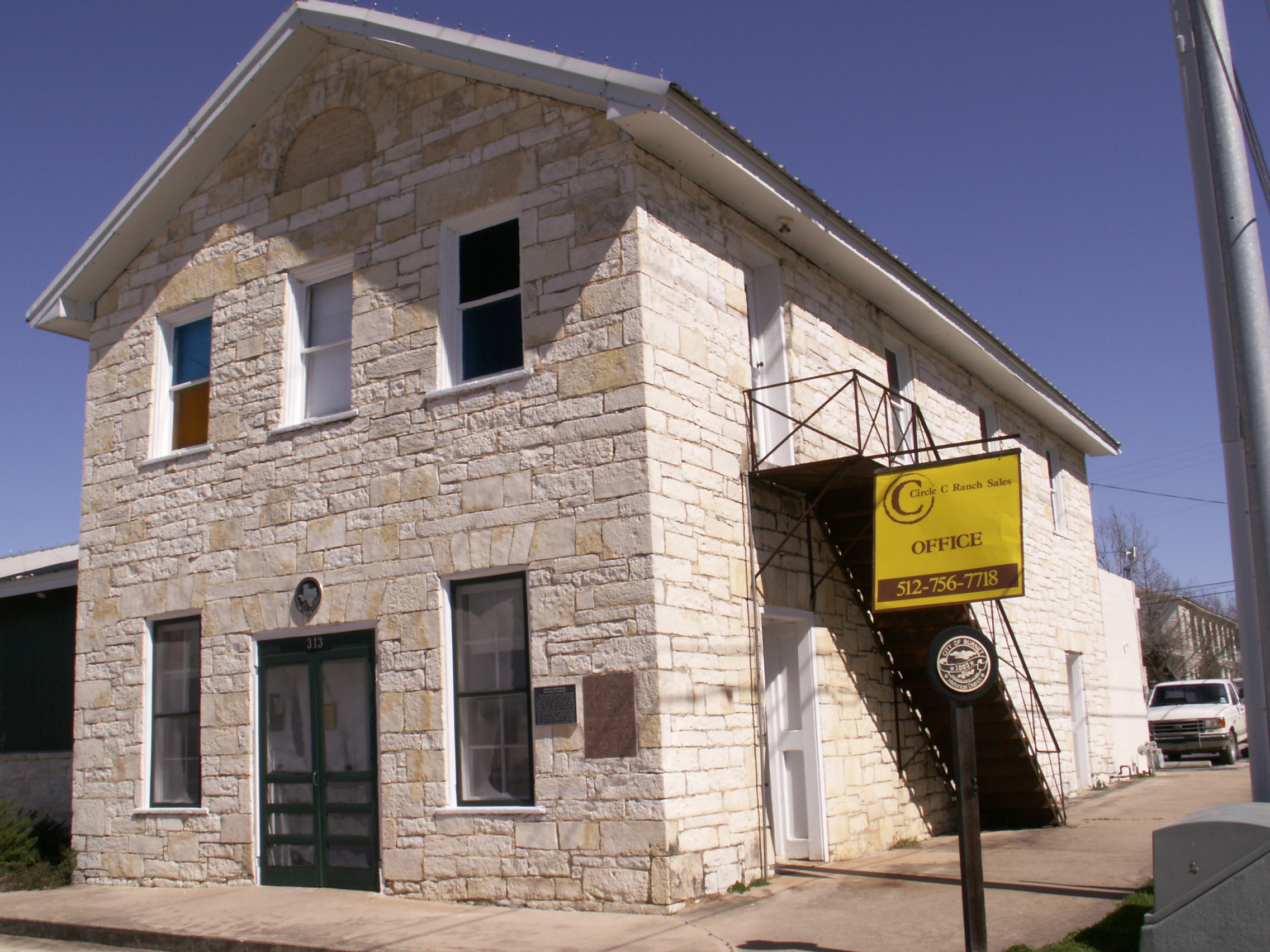
Mercantile building built by Logan Vandeveer, still in use as Masonic Lodge

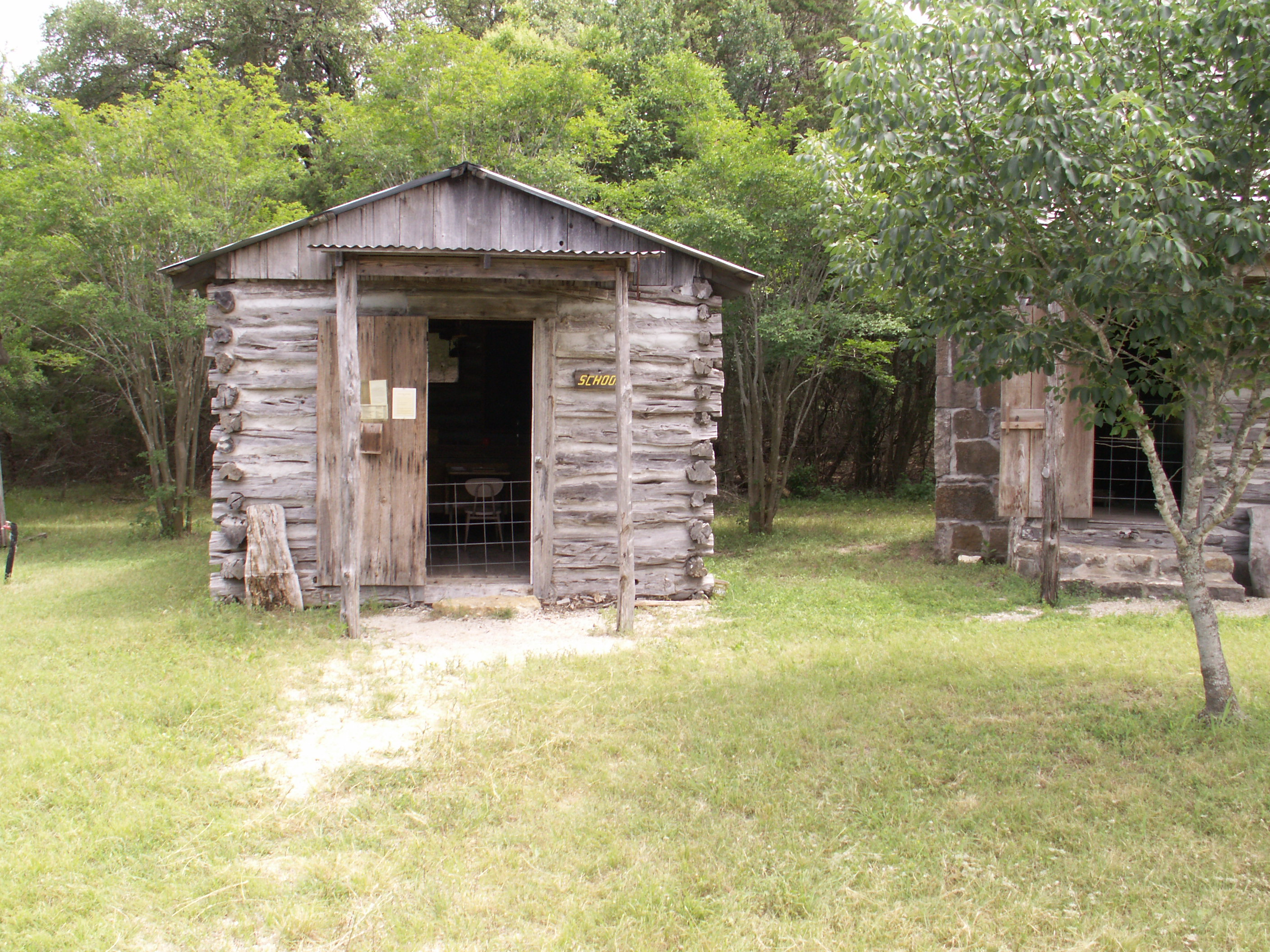
One-room schoolhouse now located at Ft. Croghan

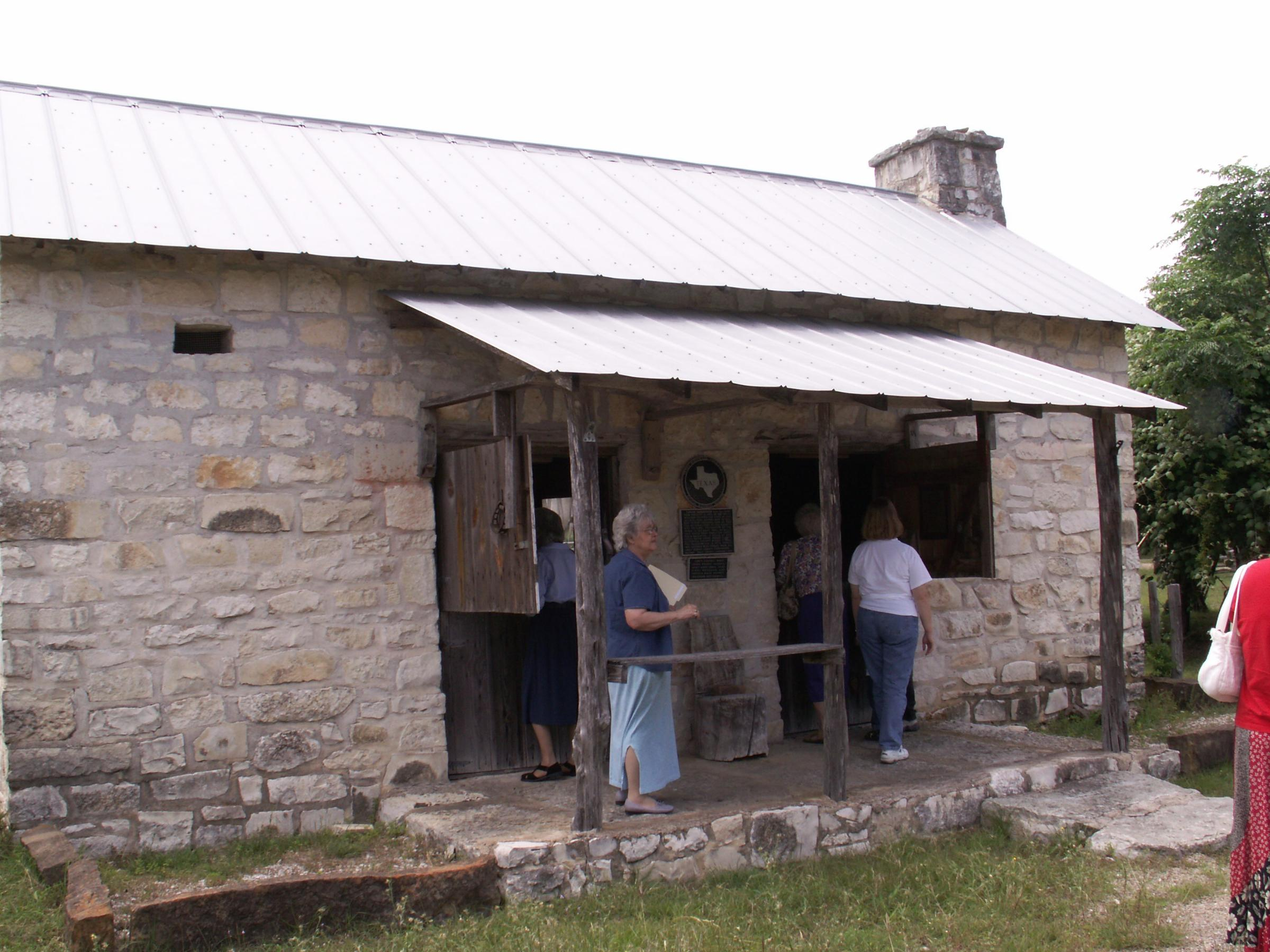
Logan Vandeveer built this home for his father, William. It was originally located east of Hamilton Creek.

Vandeveer was a leader in presenting the petition to the legislature in 1852 to establish Burnet County and was instrumental in having the town of Burnet named the county seat. He was appointed postmaster at Burnet by Samuel D. Hubbard, US Postmaster General, August, 1852. In 1853, he opened the first Burnet school, known as the Collegiate School, hiring as teacher William H. Dixon, an Oxford University graduate. A number of subjects, including French, Latin, geography, history, philosophy, mathematics, and elocution, were taught in the one-room school pictured at right.

In 1854, Vandeveer and an associate built the first substantial building in the town, a two-story stone building for use as a mercantile building and Masonic Lodge meeting place. It is still in use today for that purpose. A rock house was also built for his family and his father, William, and was located east of Hamilton Creek. His daughter later lived there and the home was continuously occupied for many years. It has since been restored and moved to the grounds of Fort Croghan.

== Death ==
In the summer of 1855, following a severe drought, Vandeveer, his brother Zachary, and three other men took a large herd of cattle to Louisiana. Vandeveer developed yellow fever and died on September 2, 1855, in Plaquemines Parish, where he is buried. His brother Zachary also died of yellow fever two days later. His death left a void in the civic leadership of his home state. He had maintained friendly relations with the Comanche Indians in Central Texas. Many depredations occurred afterwards that continued until their final extermination. A section of Burnet, known as the Vandeveer addition, and a street bear his name.
