= Burnet County, Texas =

County in Texas, United States

- County
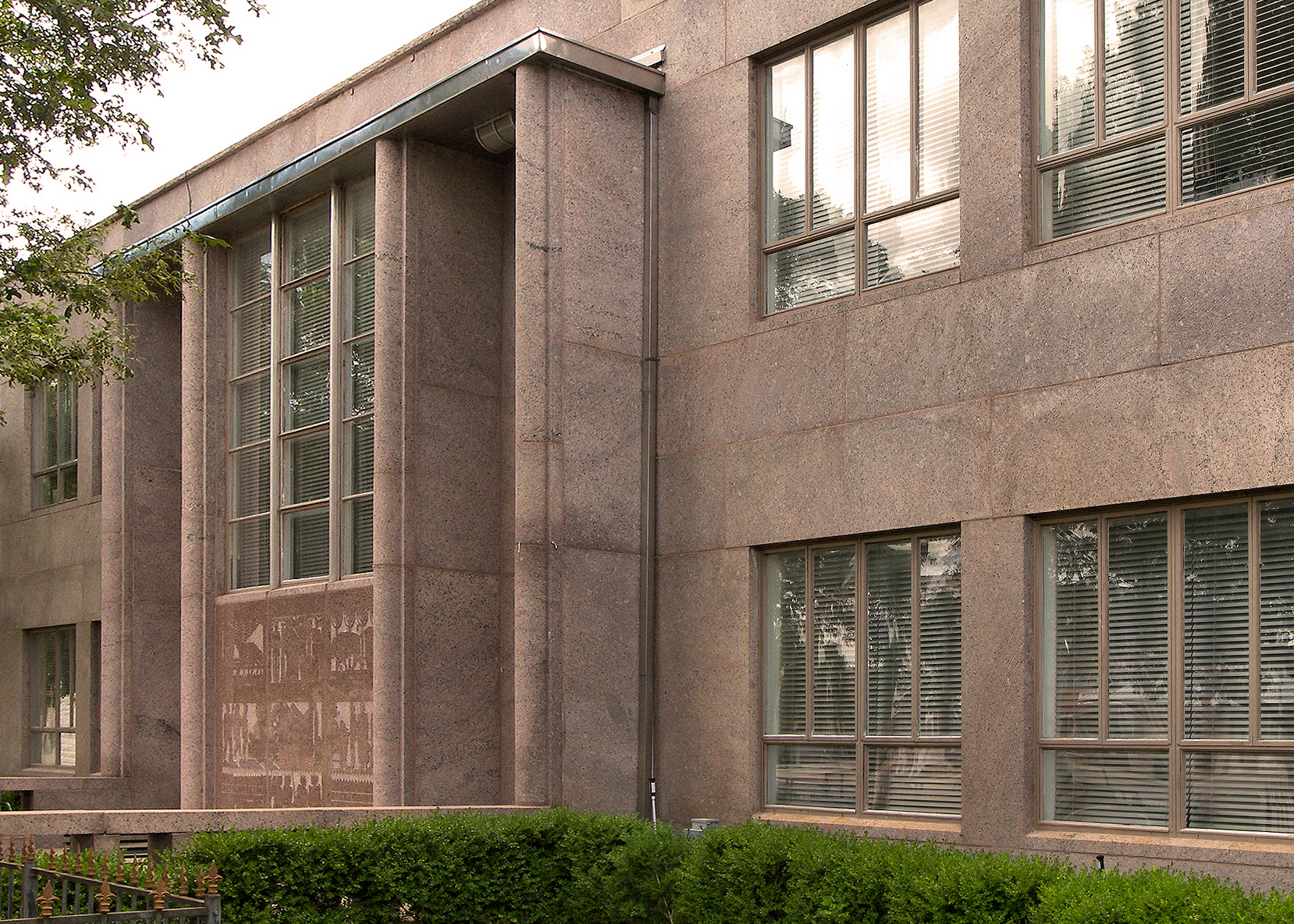
- The Burnet County Courthouse in Burnet

- Location within the U.S. state of Texas
- Coordinates: 30°47′N 98°11′W
- Country: United States
- State: Texas
- Founded: 1854
- Named for: David Gouverneur Burnet
- Seat: Burnet
- Largest city: Marble Falls

Area
  - Total: 1,021 sq mi (2,640 km^{2})
  - Land: 994 sq mi (2,570 km^{2})
  - Water: 27 sq mi (70 km^{2}) 2.6%

Population (2020)
  - Total: 49,130
  - Estimate (2025): 57,015 ▲
  - Density: 49.4/sq mi (19.1/km^{2})
- Time zone: UTC−6 (Central)
  - Summer (DST): UTC−5 (CDT)
- Congressional district: 31st
- Website: www.burnetcountytexas.org

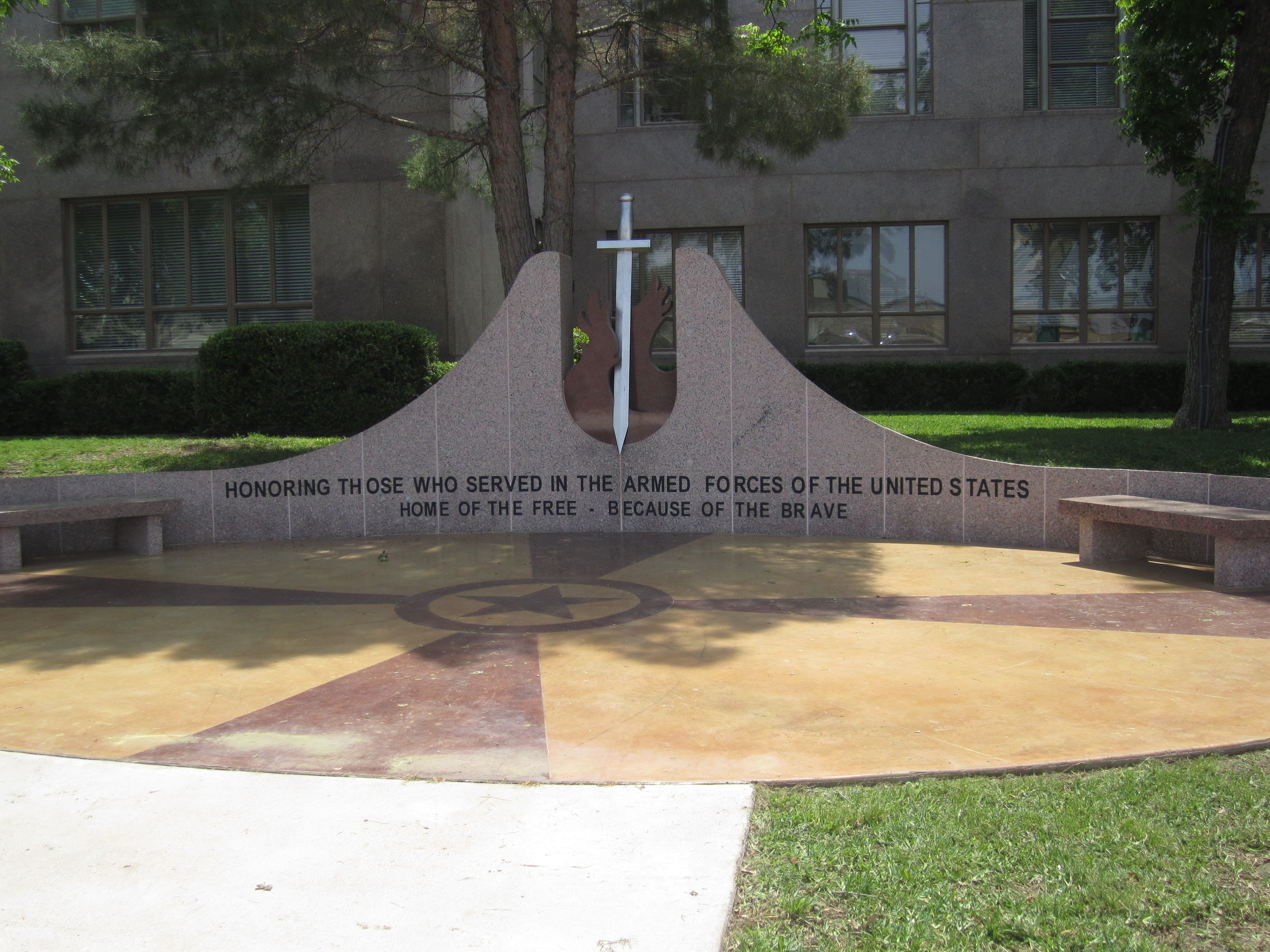
Veterans Memorial at Burnet County courthouse

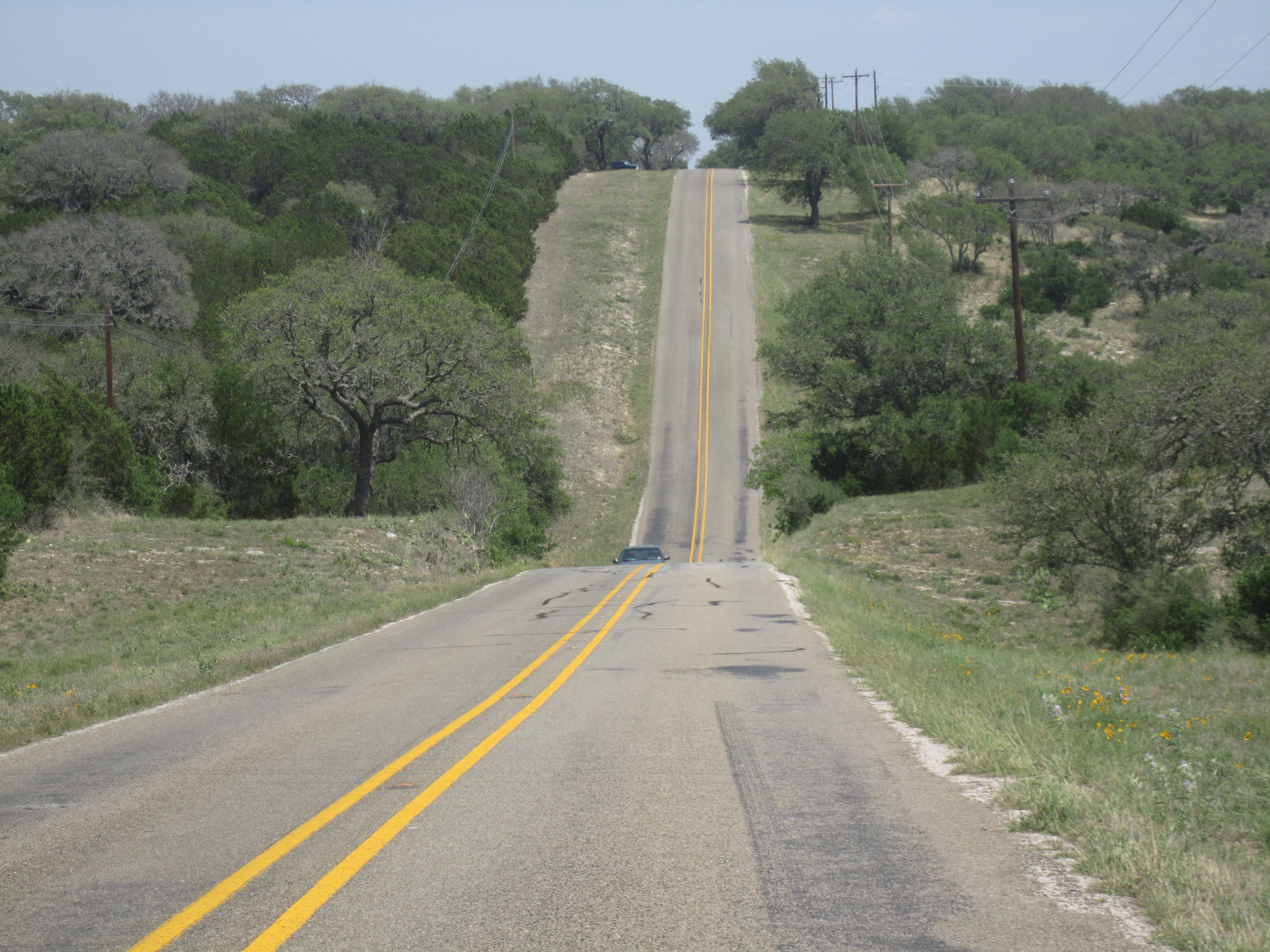
Rolling highway in Burnet County in Texas Hill Country toward Longhorn Cavern State Park

Burnet County (/ˈbɜːrnɪt/ BUR-nit) is a county located on the Edwards Plateau in the U.S. state of Texas. As of the 2020 census, its population was 49,130. Its county seat is Burnet. The 2025 county population estimate was 57,015. The county was founded in 1852 and later organized in 1854. It is named for David Gouverneur Burnet, the first (provisional) president of the Republic of Texas. The name of the county is pronounced with the emphasis or accent on the first syllable, just as is the case with its namesake.

== History ==
Indigenous peoples inhabited the area as early as 4500 BC. Later known tribes in the area include Tonkawa, Lipan Apache, and Comanche.

During the 1820s-1830s, Stephen F. Austin and Green DeWitt conducted surveying and Indian-fighting explorations. In 1849, the United States established Fort Croghan, and in 1848, the first settlers arrived in the county, Samuel Eli Holland, Logan Vandeveer, Peter Kerr, William Harrison Magill, Noah Smithwick, Captain Jesse B. Burnham, R. H. Hall, Adam Rankin "Stovepipe" Johnson, and Captain Christian Dorbandt. In 1851, 20 Mormon families under the leadership of Lyman Wight establish a colony at Hamilton Creek, later to be known as Morman Mill.

In 1852, the Fourth Texas Legislature created Burnet County from Bell, Travis, and Williamson Counties. The first post office was established at Hamilton in 1853.

In 1860, 235 slaves were in Burnet County. After the war, some former slaves left the county, but many stayed. A group of them settled on land in the eastern part of Oatmeal. In 1870, the black population of the county had increased to 358, keeping pace with the growth of the total number of residents; the number of blacks had fallen to 248 by 1880, however, and the number of new white residents was such that after 1890, blacks represented less than 3% of the total population. Some found work on farms and ranches, but by the turn of the century, many had moved into the Marble Falls area to work in town.

During 1882–1903, railroad tracks connected Burnet, Granite Mountain, Marble Falls, and Lampasas. Lake Victor and Bertram became shipping-point communities. Other communities lost population as the railroad offered employment. During the Great Depression, county farmers suffered financially, but found work with government-sponsored public-works projects. The Lower Colorado River Authority employed hundreds of people for the construction of the Hamilton (Buchanan) Dam and Roy B. Inks Dam.

== Geography ==
According to the U.S. Census Bureau, the county has a total area of 1,021 sq mi (2,640 km^{2}), of which 27 sq mi (70 km^{2}) (2.6%) are covered by water.

=== Major highways ===
- U.S. Highway 183
- U.S. Highway 281
- State Highway 29
- State Highway 71
- Loop 308
- Spur 191

=== Adjacent counties ===
- Lampasas County (north)
- Bell County (northeast)
- Williamson County (east)
- Travis County (southeast)
- Blanco County (south)
- Llano County (west)
- San Saba County (northwest)

=== National protected area ===
- Balcones Canyonlands National Wildlife Refuge (part)

== Demographics ==
Historical population
Census	Pop.	Note	%±
1860	2,487		—
1870	3,688		48.3%
1880	6,855		85.9%
1890	10,747		56.8%
1900	10,528		−2.0%
1910	10,755		2.2%
1920	9,499		−11.7%
1930	10,355		9.0%
1940	10,771		4.0%
1950	10,356		−3.9%
1960	9,265		−10.5%
1970	11,420		23.3%
1980	17,803		55.9%
1990	22,677		27.4%
2000	34,147		50.6%
2010	42,750		25.2%
2020	49,130		14.9%
2025 (est.)	57,015	▲	16.0%
U.S. Decennial Census; 1850–2010 2010 2020

=== Racial and ethnic composition ===
Burnet County, Texas – Racial and ethnic composition Note: the US Census treats Hispanic/Latino as an ethnic category. This table excludes Latinos from the racial categories and assigns them to a separate category. Hispanics/Latinos may be of any race.
Race / Ethnicity (NH = Non-Hispanic)	Pop 1980	Pop 1990	Pop 2000	Pop 2010	Pop 2020	% 1980	% 1990	% 2000	% 2010	% 2020
White alone (NH)	16,178	19,814	28,017	32,530	34,810	90.87%	87.37%	82.05%	76.09%	70.85%
Black or African American alone (NH)	269	255	500	700	579	1.51%	1.12%	1.46%	1.64%	1.18%
Native American or Alaska Native alone (NH)	38	98	155	169	183	0.21%	0.43%	0.45%	0.40%	0.37%
Asian alone (NH)	42	50	89	198	424	0.24%	0.22%	0.26%	0.46%	0.86%
Native Hawaiian or Pacific Islander alone (NH)	x	x	13	13	14	x	x	0.04%	0.03%	0.03%
Other race alone (NH)	18	20	15	44	147	0.10%	0.09%	0.04%	0.10%	0.30%
Multiracial (NH)	x	x	314	444	1,774	x	x	0.92%	1.04%	3.61%
Hispanic or Latino (any race)	1,258	2,440	5,044	8,652	11,199	7.07%	10.76%	14.77%	20.24%	22.79%
Total	17,803	22,677	34,147	42,750	49,130	100.00%	100.00%	100.00%	100.00%	100.00%

=== 2020 census ===
As of the 2020 census, the county had a population of 49,130 and a median age of 45.9 years. About 20.7% of residents were under 18 and 24.1% were 65 or older. For every 100 females, there were 96.6 males, and for every 100 females 18 and over, there were 93.9 males 18 and over.

The racial makeup of the county was 77.0% White, 1.3% Black or African American, 0.8% American Indian and Alaska Native, 0.9% Asian, <0.1% Native Hawaiian and Pacific Islander, 8.7% from some other race, and 11.3% from two or more races. Hispanic or Latino residents of any race comprised 22.8% of the population.

About 32.7% of residents lived in urban areas, while 67.3% lived in rural areas.

Of the 19,245 households in the county, 27.6% had children under 18 living in them, 55.0% were married-couple households, 16.4% were households with a male householder and no spouse or partner present, and 23.5% were households with a female householder and no spouse or partner present. About 25.2% of all households were made up of individuals, and 13.7% had someone living alone who was 65 or older.

The county had 23,436 housing units, of which 17.9% were vacant. Among occupied housing units, 75.2% were owner-occupied and 24.8% were renter-occupied. The homeowner vacancy rate was 1.7% and the rental vacancy rate was 7.7%.

== Communities ==
=== Cities ===
- Bertram
- Burnet (county seat)
- Cottonwood Shores
- Double Horn
- Granite Shoals
- Highland Haven
- Horseshoe Bay (mostly in Llano County)
- Marble Falls
- Meadowlakes

=== Census-designated place ===
- Briggs

=== Unincorporated communities ===
- Fairland
- Joppa
- Lake Victor
- Mahomet
- Naruna
- Oakalla
- Oatmeal
- Sherwood Shores
- Shovel Mountain
- Silver Creek Village
- Smithwick
- Spicewood
- Watson

== Notable people ==
- Adam R. "Stovepipe" Johnson, Confederate general and 1887 founder of Marble Falls, despite being blinded during the war
- Gerald Lyda (1923–2005), general contractor and cattle rancher, born and raised in Burnet County
- Stephen McGee (born September 27, 1985), former American football quarterback, played college football for Texas A&M, drafted and played NFL football for the Dallas Cowboys
- James Oakley, former county commissioner (1998–2005) and county judge (2015–present)
- Logan Vandeveer, early Texas soldier, ranger, cattleman and civic leader, a leader in presenting the petition to the legislature in 1852 to establish Burnet County and was instrumental in having the town of Burnet named the county seat
- Al Witcher (born 1936), American football player

== Politics ==
United States presidential election results for Burnet County, Texas
Year	Republican		Democratic		Third party(ies)	
Year	No.	%	No.	%	No.	%
1912	85	10.87%	623	79.67%	74	9.46%
1916	115	10.87%	913	86.29%	30	2.84%
1920	241	18.98%	795	62.60%	234	18.43%
1924	277	13.45%	1,725	83.74%	58	2.82%
1928	936	66.67%	467	33.26%	1	0.07%
1932	144	7.02%	1,904	92.88%	2	0.10%
1936	111	6.54%	1,583	93.34%	2	0.12%
1940	233	9.66%	2,177	90.26%	2	0.08%
1944	228	10.80%	1,697	80.35%	187	8.85%
1948	287	12.35%	1,955	84.12%	82	3.53%
1952	1,270	46.98%	1,431	52.94%	2	0.07%
1956	1,163	44.90%	1,422	54.90%	5	0.19%
1960	1,189	39.95%	1,770	59.48%	17	0.57%
1964	821	24.08%	2,585	75.81%	4	0.12%
1968	1,459	36.68%	1,876	47.16%	643	16.16%
1972	3,438	73.34%	1,227	26.17%	23	0.49%
1976	2,777	41.85%	3,818	57.53%	41	0.62%
1980	4,033	50.84%	3,711	46.78%	189	2.38%
1984	5,895	66.18%	2,983	33.49%	29	0.33%
1988	5,120	53.85%	4,343	45.68%	45	0.47%
1992	4,272	39.53%	3,638	33.66%	2,897	26.81%
1996	5,744	51.99%	4,123	37.32%	1,182	10.70%
2000	9,286	70.18%	3,557	26.88%	389	2.94%
2004	11,456	72.77%	4,147	26.34%	139	0.88%
2008	12,059	71.38%	4,608	27.28%	226	1.34%
2012	12,843	76.46%	3,674	21.87%	279	1.66%
2016	14,638	76.22%	3,797	19.77%	769	4.00%
2020	18,767	75.93%	5,639	22.81%	311	1.26%
2024	21,795	77.42%	6,114	21.72%	244	0.87%

United States Senate election results for Burnet County, Texas1
Year	Republican		Democratic		Third party(ies)	
Year	No.	%	No.	%	No.	%
2024	21,056	74.97%	6,401	22.79%	629	2.24%

United States Senate election results for Burnet County, Texas2
Year	Republican		Democratic		Third party(ies)	
Year	No.	%	No.	%	No.	%
2020	18,687	76.15%	5,323	21.69%	530	2.16%

Texas Gubernatorial election results for Burnet County
Year	Republican		Democratic		Third party(ies)	
Year	No.	%	No.	%	No.	%
2022	16,505	78.18%	4,337	20.54%	269	1.27%

== See also ==
- List of museums in Central Texas
- National Register of Historic Places listings in Burnet County, Texas
- Recorded Texas Historic Landmarks in Burnet County
