= Burnet Consolidated Independent School District =

School district in Texas, United States

Location
- Burnet, Texas, 77378; United States

District information
- Type: Public
- Grades: PK–12
- Superintendent: Dr. Aaron Peña
- Governing agency: Texas Education Agency
- Schools: 7
- NCES District ID: 4812220

Students and staff
- Enrollment: 3,304 (2022–2023)
- Teachers: 234.98 (on an FTE basis)
- Student–teacher ratio: 14.06

Other information
- Website: www.burnetcisd.net

Burnet Consolidated Independent School District is a public school district based in Burnet, Texas, United States. Located in Burnet County, small portions of the district extend into Llano and Williamson Counties.

In 2009, the school district was rated "academically acceptable" by the Texas Education Agency.

== Schools ==
- Burnet High School (grades 9-12)
- Burnet Middle (grades 6-8)
- R.J. Richey Elementary (grades 4-5)
- Shady Grove Elementary (grades 2-3)
- Burnet Elementary (prekindergarten-grade 1)
- Bertram Elementary School (prekindergarten-grade 5)
  - 2007 National Blue Ribbon School
- Quest High School (alternative campus, grades 9-12)
