= Burnet, Texas =

- City
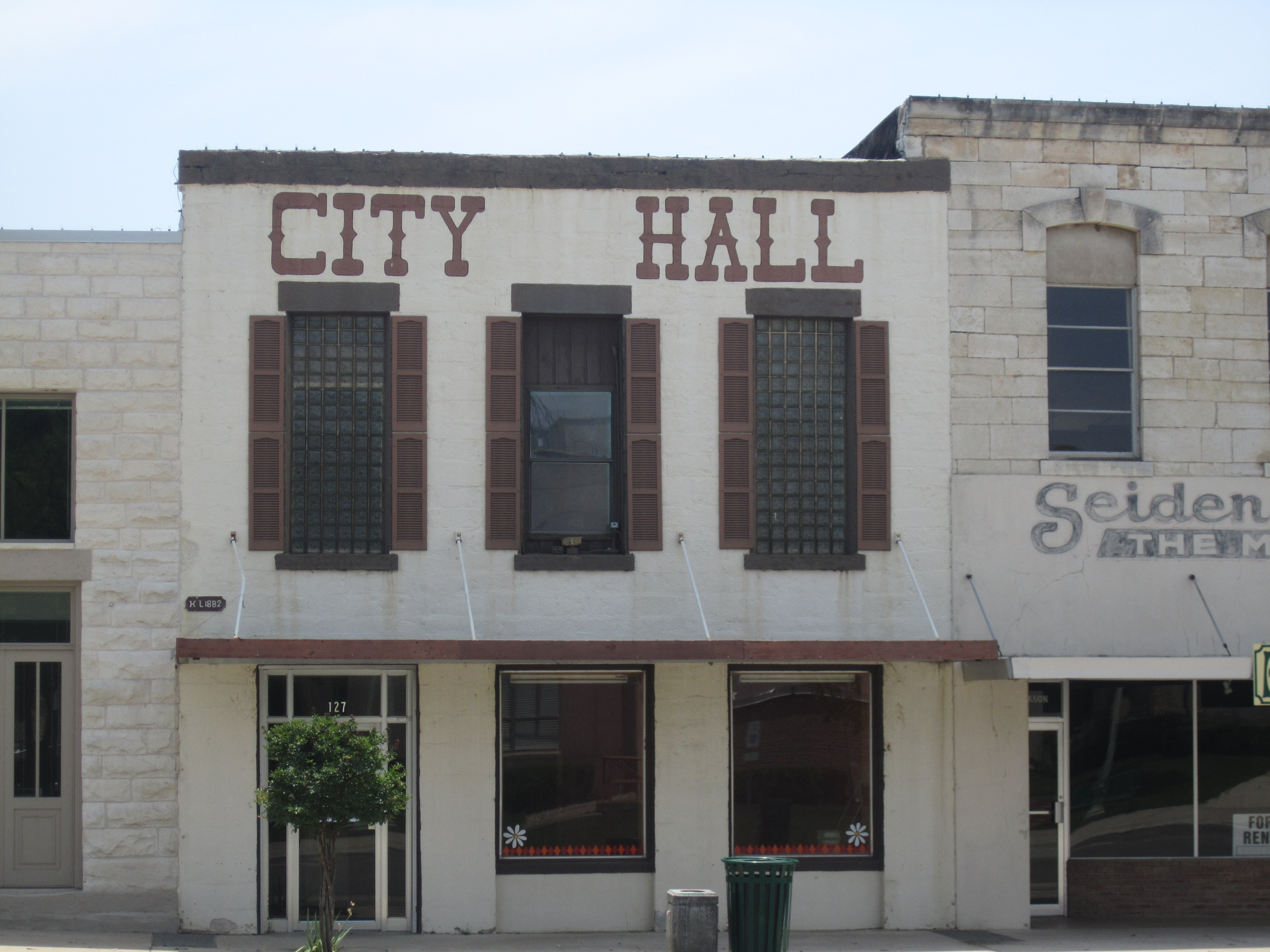
- City Hall in Burnet
- Nickname: Bluebonnet Capital of Texas
- Motto: "Lakes, Hills, History"
- Interactive map of Burnet, Texas
- Coordinates: 30°44′32″N 98°14′18″W
- Country: United States
- State: Texas
- County: Burnet

Area
  - Total: 10.40 sq mi (26.94 km^{2})
  - Land: 10.37 sq mi (26.85 km^{2})
  - Water: 0.035 sq mi (0.09 km^{2})
- Elevation: 1,339 ft (408 m)

Population (2020)
  - Total: 6,436
  - Density: 620.8/sq mi (239.7/km^{2})
- Time zone: UTC−6 (CST)
  - Summer (DST): UTC−5 (CDT)
- ZIP Code: 78611
- Area codes: 512 and 737
- FIPS code: 48-11464
- GNIS feature ID: 2409948
- Website: www.cityofburnet.com

Burnet (/ˈbɜːrnɪt/ BUR-nit) is a city in and the county seat of Burnet County, Texas, United States. Its population was 6,436 at the 2020 census.

Both the city and the county were named for David Gouverneur Burnet, the first (provisional) president of the Republic of Texas. He also served as vice president during the administration of Mirabeau B. Lamar.

== Geography ==
Burnet is located one mile west of the divide between the Brazos and Colorado River watersheds near the center of Burnet County. It is 54 miles (87 km) northwest of the state capital, Austin—roughly a 60- to 90-minute drive via U.S. Highway 183 and State Highway 29. It is 36 miles (58 km) west of Georgetown and Interstate Highway 35 via State Highway 29, and 100 miles (160 km) north of San Antonio on U.S. Highway 281.

According to the United States Census Bureau, Burnet has a total area of 10.2 square miles (26.3 km^{2}), of which 0.04 square miles (0.1 km^{2}), or 0.32%, is covered by water.

=== Climate ===
The climate in this area is characterized by hot, humid summers and generally mild to cool winters. According to the Köppen climate classification, Burnet has a humid subtropical climate, Cfa on climate maps. Some temperatures at 90 °F (32 °C) or above have been observed in every month of the year.

Climate data for Burnet, Texas (1991–2020 normals, extremes 1896–present)
Month	Jan	Feb	Mar	Apr	May	Jun	Jul	Aug	Sep	Oct	Nov	Dec	Year
Record high °F (°C)	95 (35)	100 (38)	100 (38)	102 (39)	104 (40)	110 (43)	114 (46)	114 (46)	108 (42)	105 (41)	92 (33)	92 (33)	114 (46)
Mean maximum °F (°C)	77.7 (25.4)	80.9 (27.2)	84.3 (29.1)	90.5 (32.5)	94.2 (34.6)	97.7 (36.5)	100.3 (37.9)	101.2 (38.4)	97.5 (36.4)	91.0 (32.8)	82.6 (28.1)	77.7 (25.4)	102.7 (39.3)
Mean daily maximum °F (°C)	58.6 (14.8)	62.6 (17.0)	69.9 (21.1)	77.2 (25.1)	83.8 (28.8)	90.4 (32.4)	93.9 (34.4)	94.5 (34.7)	87.6 (30.9)	78.5 (25.8)	67.5 (19.7)	59.8 (15.4)	77.0 (25.0)
Daily mean °F (°C)	46.5 (8.1)	50.5 (10.3)	57.7 (14.3)	65.0 (18.3)	73.0 (22.8)	79.5 (26.4)	82.6 (28.1)	82.7 (28.2)	76.1 (24.5)	66.3 (19.1)	55.8 (13.2)	48.0 (8.9)	65.3 (18.5)
Mean daily minimum °F (°C)	34.4 (1.3)	38.4 (3.6)	45.5 (7.5)	52.8 (11.6)	62.2 (16.8)	68.7 (20.4)	71.4 (21.9)	70.8 (21.6)	64.6 (18.1)	54.1 (12.3)	44.2 (6.8)	36.1 (2.3)	53.6 (12.0)
Mean minimum °F (°C)	20.3 (−6.5)	23.3 (−4.8)	28.1 (−2.2)	36.8 (2.7)	46.9 (8.3)	59.3 (15.2)	65.6 (18.7)	63.9 (17.7)	51.6 (10.9)	37.6 (3.1)	26.9 (−2.8)	22.1 (−5.5)	17.3 (−8.2)
Record low °F (°C)	−4 (−20)	−1 (−18)	12 (−11)	27 (−3)	34 (1)	46 (8)	54 (12)	50 (10)	38 (3)	22 (−6)	15 (−9)	−4 (−20)	−4 (−20)
Average precipitation inches (mm)	1.94 (49)	1.95 (50)	2.86 (73)	2.32 (59)	4.07 (103)	3.17 (81)	2.09 (53)	2.42 (61)	3.39 (86)	3.57 (91)	2.64 (67)	1.92 (49)	32.34 (821)
Average snowfall inches (cm)	0.0 (0.0)	0.1 (0.25)	0.0 (0.0)	0.0 (0.0)	0.0 (0.0)	0.0 (0.0)	0.0 (0.0)	0.0 (0.0)	0.0 (0.0)	0.0 (0.0)	0.0 (0.0)	0.0 (0.0)	0.1 (0.25)
Average precipitation days (≥ 0.01 in)	5.9	6.4	7.1	5.4	7.6	6.0	4.1	4.5	5.7	5.7	5.9	5.9	70.2
Average snowy days (≥ 0.1 in)	0.0	0.2	0.0	0.0	0.0	0.0	0.0	0.0	0.0	0.0	0.0	0.0	0.2
Source: NOAA

== History ==
In December 1847, a company of the Texas Ranger Division commanded by Henry E. McCulloch established a station at the site of present-day Burnet for the protection of frontier settlers from Indian raids. In March 1849, the station was chosen as a federal fort and named Fort Croghan.

A town was founded next to Fort Croghan in 1852, when Burnet County was established. The town was originally named Hamilton after John Hamilton, who owned a league and labor of land nearby. In August 1852, a post office was established in Hamilton and named Burnet Courthouse. In 1857, 35 residents of the town petitioned the state legislature to change the name of the town to Burnet since another town in Texas was named Hamilton; the name was changed in 1858. Major growth occurred with the arrival of the Austin and Northwestern Railroad in April 1882, when Burnet became the railhead for the area to the west. After the railroad was extended to Llano in 1892, Burnet declined as a supply point and became a farming and livestock center. The City of Burnet was incorporated in 1883.

The Burnet Bulletin newspaper has served the community since 1873 and is the official paper of record for the city and Burnet County.

== Demographics ==
Historical population
Census	Pop.	Note	%±
1870	280		—
1880	490		75.0%
1890	1,454		196.7%
1900	1,003		−31.0%
1910	981		−2.2%
1920	966		−1.5%
1930	1,055		9.2%
1940	1,945		84.4%
1950	2,394		23.1%
1960	2,214		−7.5%
1970	2,864		29.4%
1980	3,410		19.1%
1990	3,423		0.4%
2000	4,735		38.3%
2010	5,987		26.4%
2020	6,436		7.5%
U.S. Decennial Census

=== 2020 census ===
Racial composition as of the 2020 census
Race	Percent
White	75.8%
Black or African American	2.6%
American Indian and Alaska Native	0.8%
Asian	1.3%
Native Hawaiian and Other Pacific Islander	<0.1%
Some other race	8.6%
Two or more races	10.9%
Hispanic or Latino (of any race)	23.4%

As of the 2020 census, Burnet had a population of 6,436. The median age was 39.6 years; 21.4% of residents were under the age of 18 and 21.0% of residents were 65 years of age or older. For every 100 females there were 81.3 males, and for every 100 females age 18 and over there were 76.7 males age 18 and over.

74.4% of residents lived in urban areas, while 25.6% lived in rural areas.

There were 2,315 households in Burnet, of which 31.5% had children under the age of 18 living in them. Of all households, 46.0% were married-couple households, 15.6% were households with a male householder and no spouse or partner present, and 32.9% were households with a female householder and no spouse or partner present. About 30.5% of all households were made up of individuals and 17.4% had someone living alone who was 65 years of age or older.

There were 2,538 housing units, of which 8.8% were vacant. Among occupied housing units, 61.6% were owner-occupied and 38.4% were renter-occupied. The homeowner vacancy rate was 2.6% and the rental vacancy rate was 7.1%.

=== 2000 census ===
As of the 2000 census, Burnet had 4,735 people, 1,661 households, and 1,363 families. Of the 1,661 households, 31.7% had children under 18 living with them, 49.3% were married couples living together, 14.1% had a female householder with no husband present, and 32.9% were not families. About 28.8% of all households were made up of individuals, and 16.4% had someone living alone who was 65 or older. The average household size was 2.46, and the average family size was 3.00.

In the city, the age distribution of the population was 23.9% under 18, 9.5% from 18 to 24, 29.9% from 25 to 44, 17.8% from 45 to 64, and 18.8% who were 65 or older. The median age was 37 years.

The median income for a household in the city was $27,093, and for a family was $37,604. Males had a median income of $25,663 versus $17,163 for females. The per capita income for the city was $13,749. About 11.8% of families and 14.7% of the population were below the poverty line, including 18.1% of those under 18 and 15.2% of those 65 or over.

== Economy ==
Major employers in Burnet include the Burnet Consolidated Independent School District (285 employees), Entegris [manufacturer of materials for semiconductor and flat panel industry] (180), Burnet County government (140), Seton Highland Lakes Hospital (120), Texas Dept. of Criminal Justice substance abuse facility (120), City of Burnet government (120), H.E.B. grocery store (100), Sure Cast (92), Hoover Companies (90), Southwestern Graphite Co. (45), Whataburger (40), Bilbrough Marble Co. (25), Lone Star Industries (25), and Dash Covers, Inc. (25).

== Education ==
Burnet is served by Burnet Consolidated Independent School District and home to the Burnet High School Bulldogs.

Located outside of Burnet is a summer camp called Camp Longhorn that has three branches (Inks Lake, Indian Springs, and C3).

== Transportation ==
Burnet is served by two primary highways:

- U.S. Highway 281 – a north–south route connecting Burnet with the towns of Lampasas (22 mi north) and Marble Falls (13 mi south). San Antonio is 100 miles south.
- State Highway 29 – an east–west route connecting Burnet with Llano (30 mi west) and Georgetown (36 mi east). State Highway 29 intersects with Interstate 35 in Georgetown.

Rail service is provided by the Hill Country Flyer steam train from Cedar Park. The Hill Country Flyer is operated every Saturday in January and February, most Saturdays and Sundays March–May, and most Saturdays in October and November.

Burnet Municipal Airport, also known as Kate Craddock Field (ICAO Code KBMQ), is a general-aviation airport located about a mile south of State Highway 29 on U.S. Highway 281. It has a 5,000-foot (1,500 m) lighted runway with a full-length taxiway, which can accommodate aircraft with up to 34,000 pounds (15,000 kg) per wheel. The airport is home to the Highland Lakes Squadron of the Commemorative Air Force.

== Tourist attractions ==
Attractions in the Burnet area include the Highland Lakes, Longhorn Cavern, Inks Lake State Park, the Historic Burnet Square, the Highland Lakes Air Museum, Hill Country Motorheads Vintage Motorcycle Museum Fort Croghan Museum and Grounds, the Vanishing Texas River Cruise, Hamilton Creek Park, Spider Mountain Bike Park, Galloway Hammond Recreation Center, Delaware Springs Golf Course, and the Austin Steam Train Association's Hill Country Flyer.

The Historic Square features buildings from as early as the 1880s, which offer a variety of unique shops and eateries.

== Notable people ==
- Doak Field, a professional American football player
- Stephen McGee, football player for Texas A&M University and the Dallas Cowboys
- Andrew Moses, a native of Burnet, was a career officer in the United States Army
- Jordan Shipley, wide receiver of The University of Texas at Austin and the Cincinnati Bengals
- Logan Vandeveer was a Texas soldier, ranger, cattleman, and civic leader.

== Gallery ==
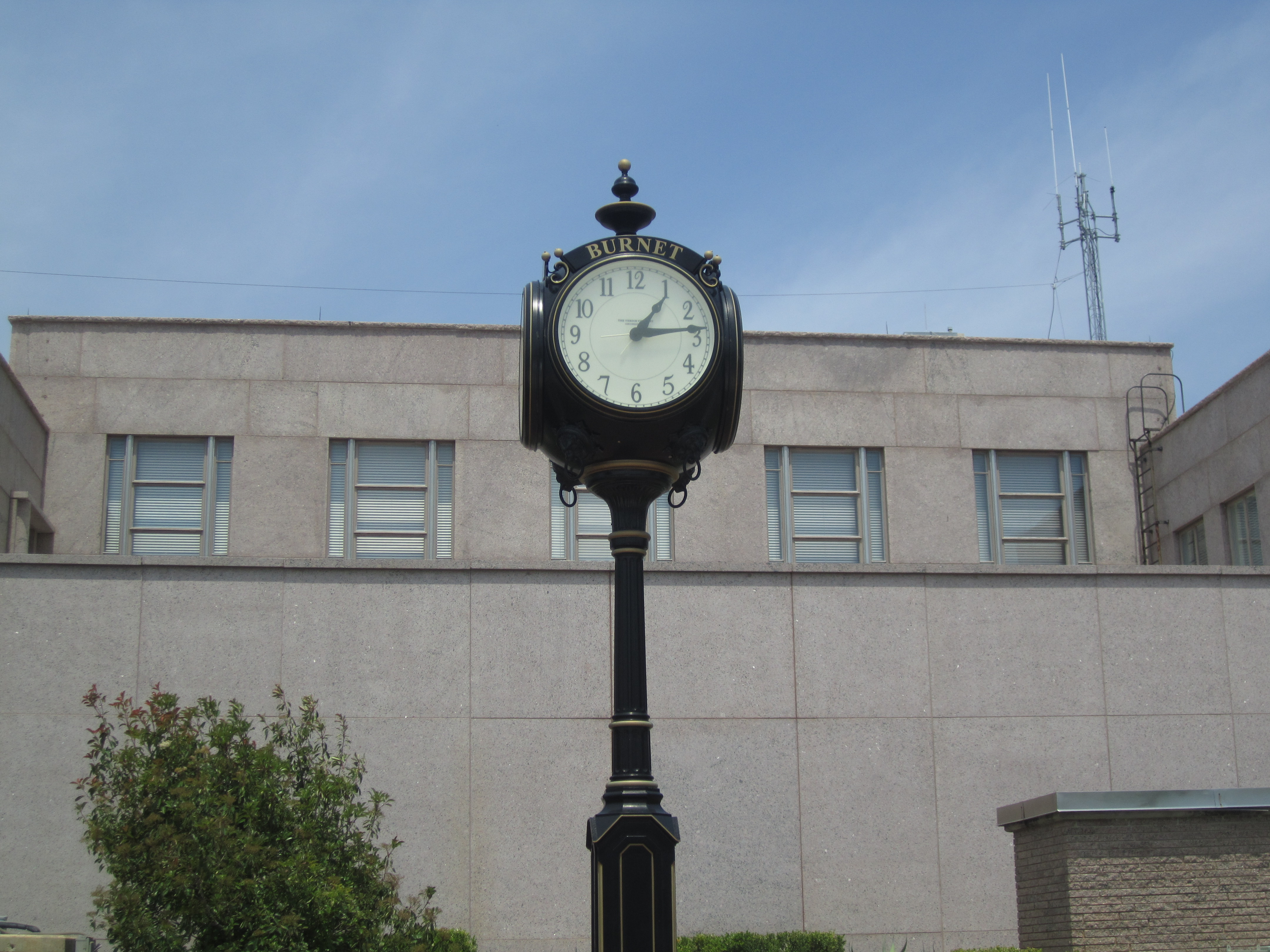
Clock at Burnet County Courthouse

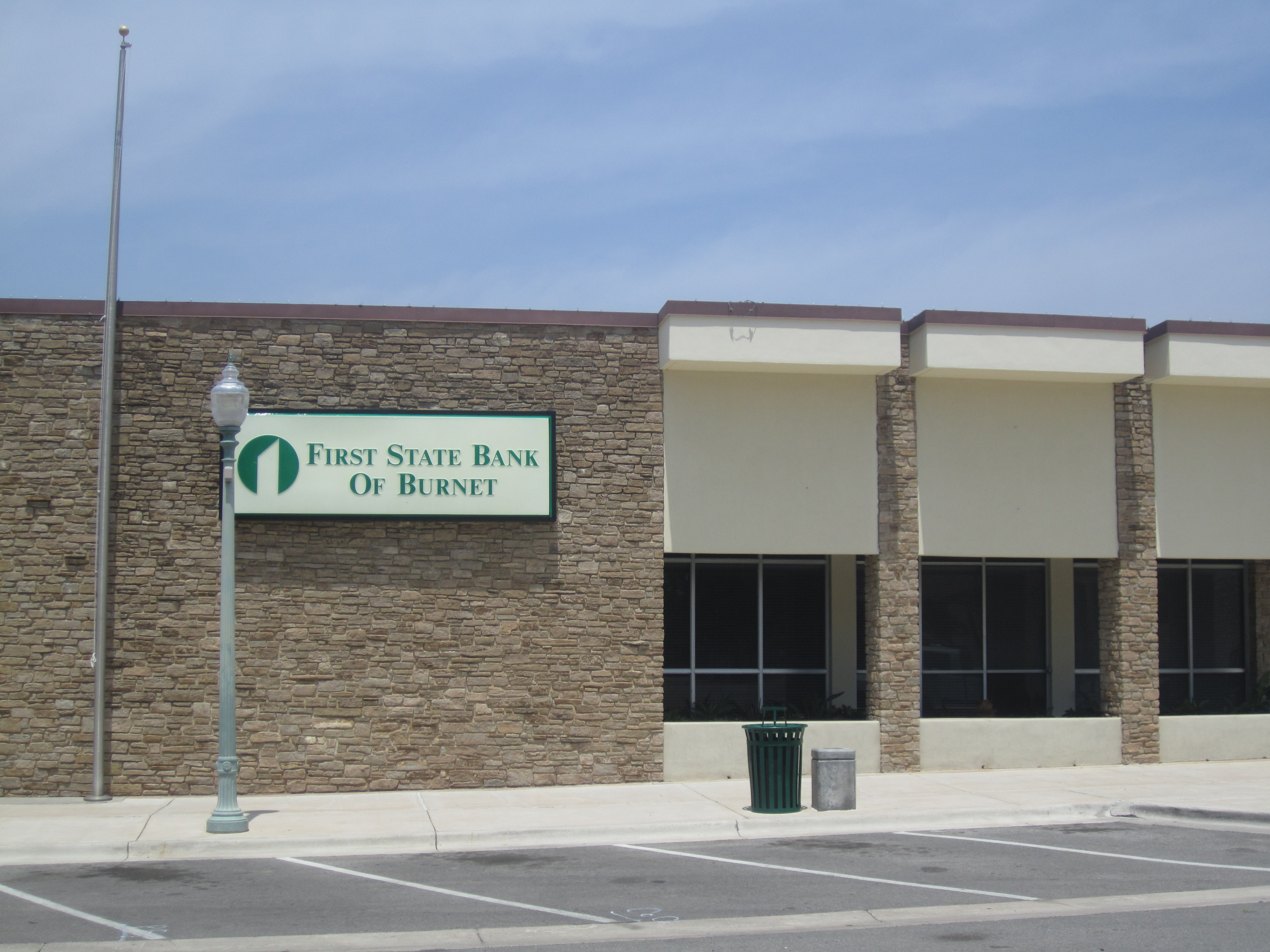
First State Bank of Burnet

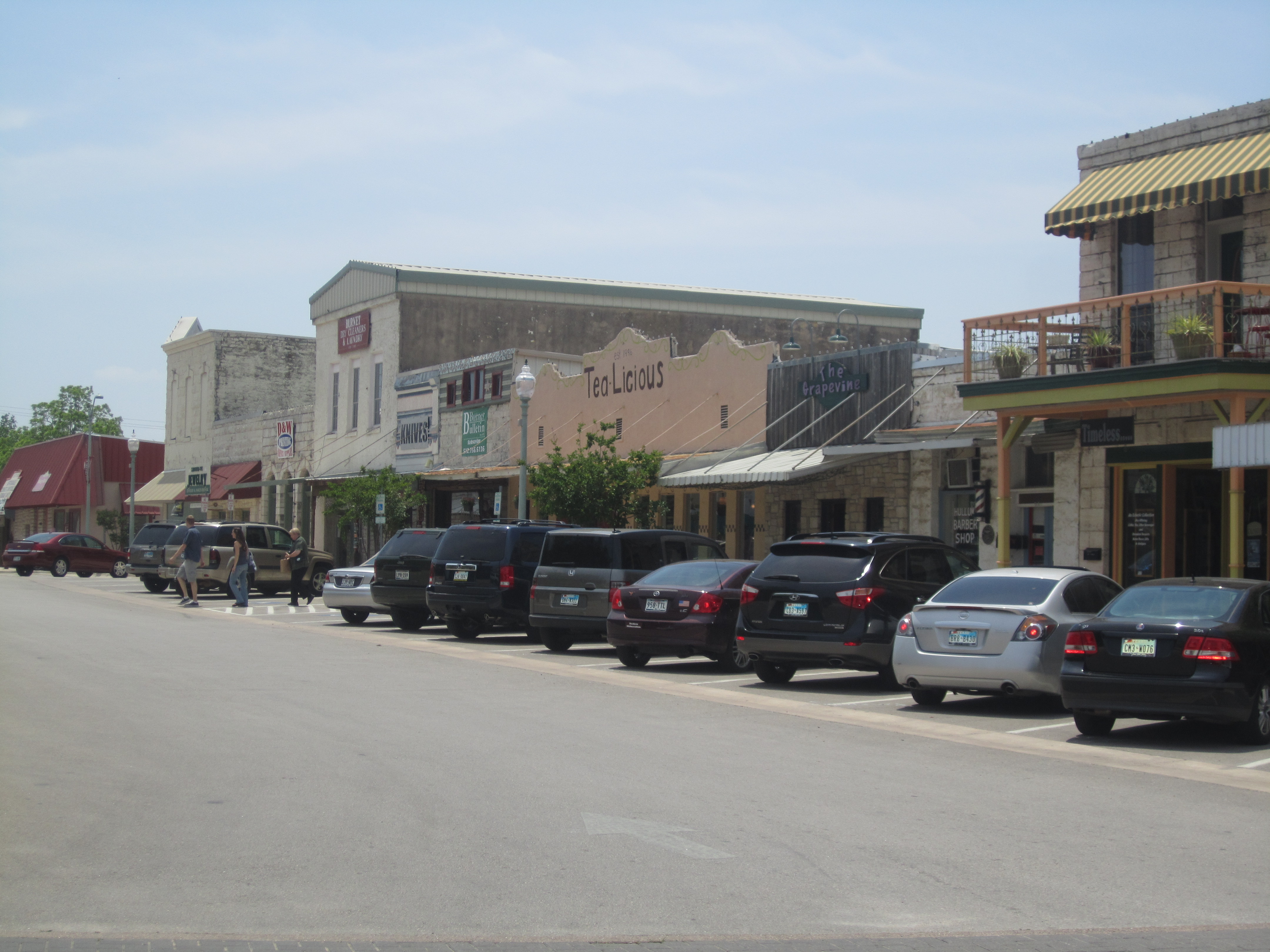
Businesses in downtown Burnet.

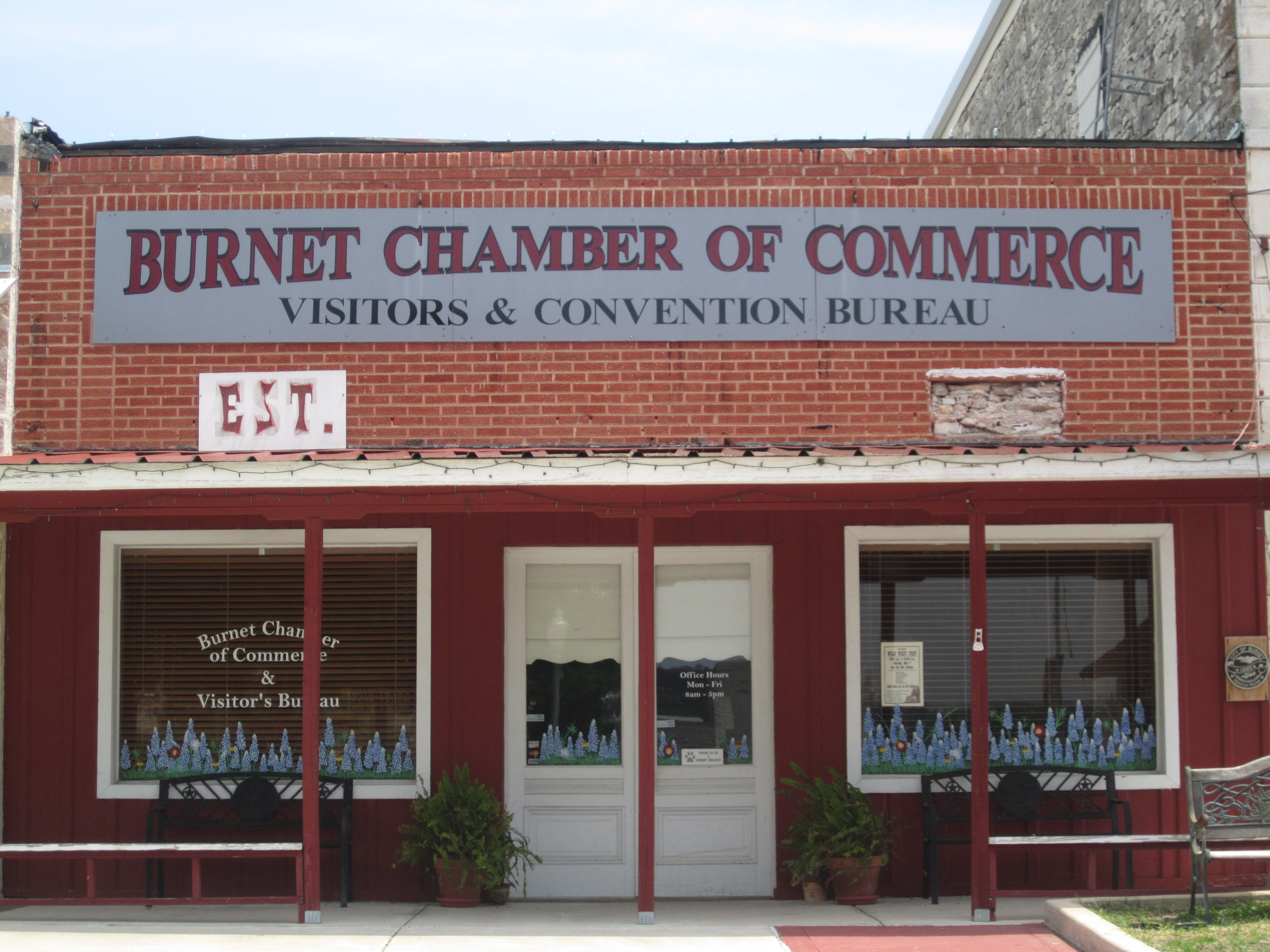
The Burnet Chamber of Commerce office is located downtown across from the courthouse.

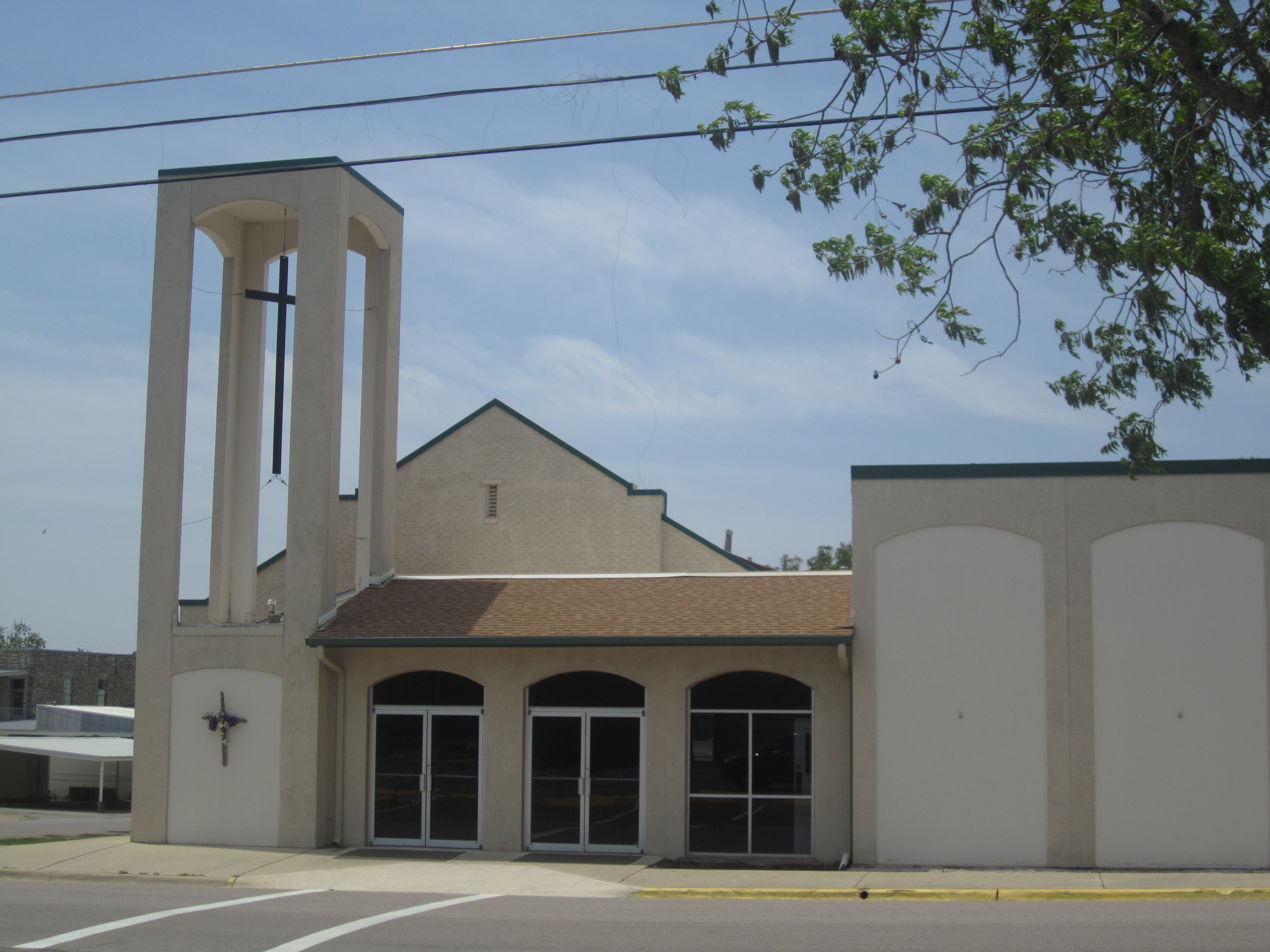
First Baptist Church in Burnet

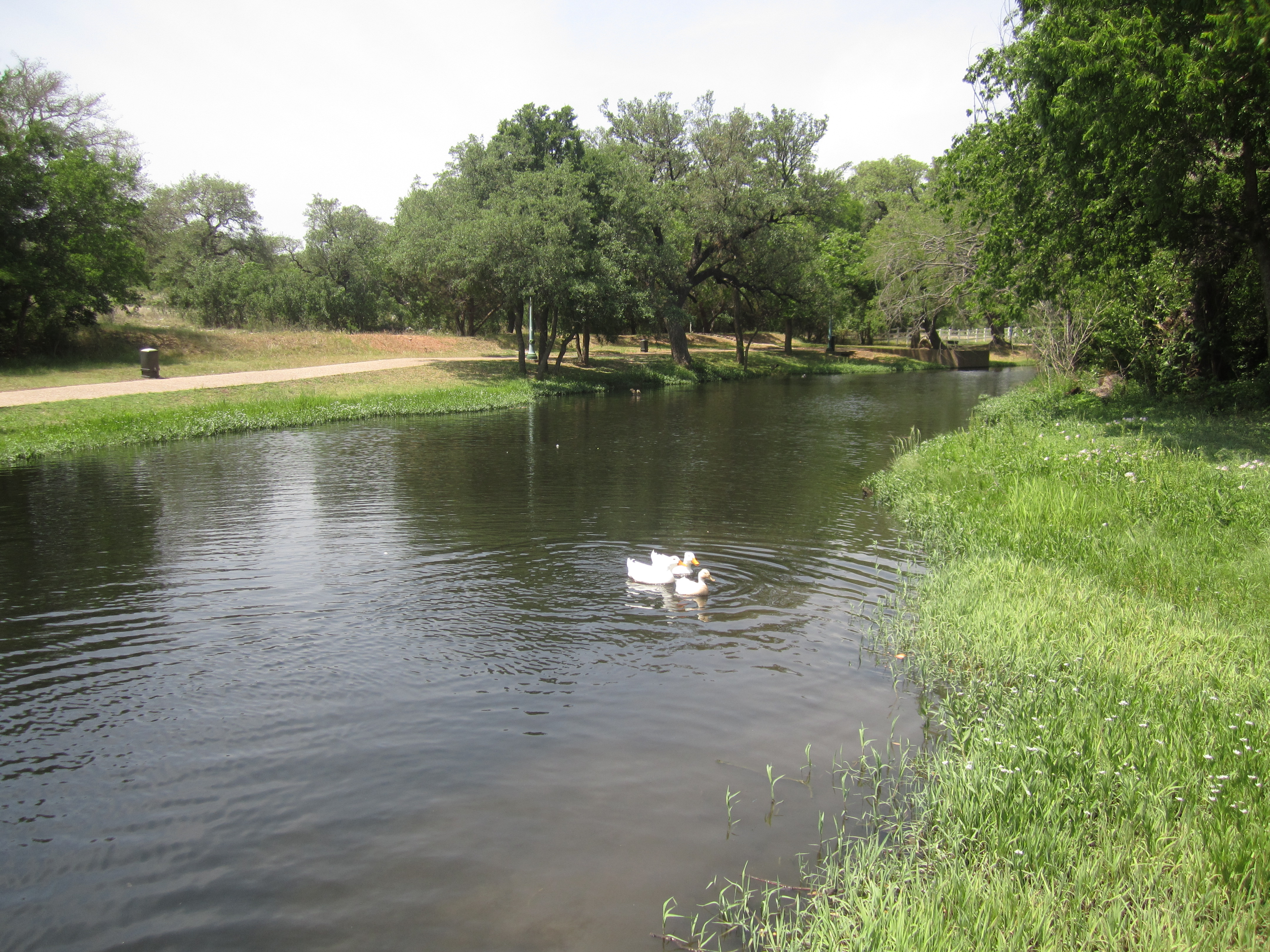
Hamilton Creek Park off U.S. Route 281 in Burnet
