= Texas State Highway 29 =

State highway in Texas

State Highway 29

Route information
- Maintained by TxDOT
- Length: 143.287 mi (Note: The certified mileage given is shorter than the actual mileage as TxDOT considers SH 29 to be discontinuous at rather than concurrent with US 87 and US 377.) (230.598 km)
- Existed: before 1939–present

Major junctions
- West end: US 83 near Menard
- US 377 in Mason; US 87 in Mason; SH 16 / SH 71 in Llano; US 281 in Burnet; US 183 in Liberty Hill; I-35 in Georgetown; SH 130 Toll in Georgetown
- East end: SH 95 near Circleville

Location
- Country: United States
- State: Texas
- Counties: Menard, Mason, Llano, Burnet, Williamson

Highway system
- Highways in Texas; Interstate; US; State; Former; Toll; Loops; Spurs; FM/RM; Park; Rec
← SH 28	→ I-30

State Highway 29 (SH 29) runs from 3.0 miles (4.8 km) south of Menard, Texas, east to SH 95 in Circleville (6.0 miles north of Taylor) via Mason, Llano, Burnet, Liberty Hill, and Georgetown in central Texas, United States.

In Georgetown, SH 29 is known as University Avenue and is the main east–west artery through the city, passing in front of Southwestern University, which has been on the same road since its Georgetown campus opened in 1873.

An open house meeting at East View High School in Georgetown was held on September 1, 2015. The meeting's purpose was to review the upcoming plans on widening SH 29 from 2 lanes (80 ft.) to 6 lanes (160 ft.). Construction will not start until after the Summer of 2016 and will occur from Southwestern Blvd extending all the way to Hwy 95 in Circleville, TX.

== Previous routes ==
Historic SH 29

SH 29 was proposed on October 8, 1917 on a route from Port O'Connor to Austin. On August 21, 1923, the section from Port Lavaca to Port O'Connor was cancelled. On January 21, 1924, SH 29 was extended to Mason, replacing the section of SH 43 from Leander to Mason and SH 29 was extended on a new route from Austin to Leander. On July 27, 1926, SH 29 was extended back to Port O'Connor. On January 17, 1928, SH 29 was extended to Rocksprings. On October 25, 1932, the southwest end was shortened to Junction. On February 14, 1933, it was extended back to Rocksprings. On June 20, 1933, the southeast end was truncated to north of Cuero, with the portion southeast of there transferred to SH 27. On March 13, 1934, SH 29 was extended through Goliad to Refugio, ending near Gregory, replacing SH 190 and part of SH 119. On July 17, 1934, SH 29 was rerouted to end in Karnes City, replacing part of SH 80 and part of SH 112. On November 27, 1934, SH 29 Spur was created in Goliad. On January 19, 1935, it was rerouted back to Refugio over part of SH 80. The old route was transferred back to SH 80 and SH 112. On February 28, 1935, SH 29 Spur in Goliad was taken over. On July 15, 1935, the sections from Cuero to SH 119 and La Bahia Mission to Gregory were cancelled (as they were not built yet). On September 22, 1936, the section from Cuero to SH 119 was restored. On November 23, 1937, the section from La Bahia Mission to Gregory was restored. On September 26, 1939, SH 29 Spur was renumbered as Spur 71. On May 23, 1951, the stretch from Liberty Hill to Gregory was reassigned to U.S. Highway 183, and the section from Mason to Rocksprings was reassigned to U.S. Highway 377. On August 22, 1951, SH 29 was extended farther east along former SH 104 from Liberty Hill to Circleville, and was also extended west from Mason along former SH 151 to Eldorado. By 1966, SH 29 had been signed along part of RM 33, all of RM 1980, FM 1257, and part of FM 305 to I-10. On June 30, 1977, the section from Menard to Eldorado, along with the signed section west of Eldorado, was redesignated U.S. Highway 190. In December 1985, SH 29 lost its 3 miles concurrent with US 83 into Menard, shortening SH 29 to its current designation.

Historic SH 29A

SH 29A was a proposed spur route designated on March 19, 1919, splitting at Luling and travelling northwest through San Marcos to Johnson City. On August 21, 1923, it had been renumbered SH 80, which the west end was shortened to end in San Marcos. SH 29A was under a feasibility study from Mason to Menard on February 20, 1928. On June 22, 1928, the feasibility study was completed, and SH 29A was designated. On March 19, 1930, this had been renumbered as SH 151.

SH 29B was a proposed spur route designated on January 15, 1923 from Cuero to San Antonio. On August 21, 1923, it had been renumbered SH 81, which extended northwest to Bandera over part of SH 27.

== Route description ==
=== US 83 to Burnet ===
SH 29 begins at an interchange with US 83 south of Menard. SH 29 travels east to Mason, where it begins an overlap with US 377 west of town. The two highways travel into town together where at US 87 SH 29 separates from US 377 and heads south on US 87 for about 1/4 mile before separating and heading east towards Llano. West of Llano, SH 29 begins an overlap with SH 71 that lasts until SH 16 in Llano. Leaving Llano, SH 29 travels on the south side of Buchanan Lake traveling near the Buchanan Dam. Less than a mile after the dam, SH 29 crosses the Colorado River/Inks Lake. The highway then heads towards Burnet, where it intersects US 281.

=== Burnet to SH 95 ===
Leaving Burnet, SH 29 travels through the towns of Bertram and Liberty Hill before intersecting US 183 at Seward Junction north of Leander. SH 29 then arrives in Georgetown, where it intersects I-35 and serves as the south boundary for Southwestern University. On the east side of town, SH 29 intersects SH 130 then travels through unincorporated Williamson County before ending at SH 95 north of Taylor.

== Junction list ==
County	Location	mi	km	Destinations	Notes
Menard		0.00	0.00	US 83 – Junction, Menard	Western terminus; Interchange
Menard		8.60	13.84	FM 2092 west – Menard	
Menard	Hext	14.29	23.00	RM 1221 south – London	
Menard		16.29	26.22	FM 1311 north	
Mason		23.44	37.72	RM 1222 north – Brady	
Mason		29.34	47.22	US 377 south – Junction	West end of US 377 overlap
Mason	Mason	33.48	53.88	US 87 north / US 377 north – Brady	East end of US 377 overlap; West end of US 87 overlap
Mason	Mason	34.92	56.20	US 87 south / RM 1871 south – Fredericksburg	East end of US 87 overlap
Mason	Mason	34.97	56.28	RM 386 north – Fredonia	
Mason		44.30	71.29	RM 1900 north	
Llano		51.62	83.07	RM 2768 south – Castell	
Llano		65.94	106.12	SH 71 west – Brady	West end of SH 71 overlap
Llano	Llano	68.77	110.67	SH 16 / SH 71 east – Comanche, Fredericksburg, Marble Falls	East end of SH 71 overlap
Llano		70.29	113.12	RM 2241 north – Paradise Point	
Llano		83.14	133.80	RM 1431 – Paradise Point, Marble Falls	
Llano	Buchanan Dam	84.68	136.28	SH 261 north – Paradise Point	
Colorado River		87.39	140.64	State Highway 29 Bridge at the Colorado River	
Burnet		88.22	141.98	RM 690 north	
Burnet		89.13	143.44	PR 4 south – Inks Lake State Park, Longhorn Cavern State Park	
Burnet		94.86	152.66	RM 2341 west	
Burnet	Burnet	98.21	158.05	US 281 – Lampasas, Marble Falls	
Burnet	Bertram	108.62	174.81	RM 243 south	West end of RM 243 overlap
Burnet	Bertram	108.80	175.10	RM 243 north / RM 1174 north (Grange Street) – Florence	East end of RM 243 overlap; West end of RM 1174 overlap
Burnet	Bertram	109.11	175.60	RM 1174 south – Balcones Canyonlands	East end of RM 1174 overlap
Williamson	Liberty Hill	117.78	189.55	Loop 332 east – Liberty Hill	
Williamson	Liberty Hill	119.12	191.71	RM 1869 – Balcones Canyonlands	
Williamson	Liberty Hill	119.49	192.30	Loop 332 west – Liberty Hill	
Williamson	Liberty Hill	121.47	195.49	US 183 / 183A Toll Road south – Lampasas, Austin	
Williamson	Georgetown	133.09	214.19	I-35 – Belton, Austin	I-35 exit 261.
Williamson	Georgetown	133.90	215.49	Austin Avenue	Former I-35 BL
Williamson	Georgetown	136.83	220.21	SH 130 Toll – Austin-Bergstrom International Airport	SH 130 exit 415.
Williamson	Jonah	142.27	228.96	FM 1660 south – Hutto	
Williamson		148.92	239.66	SH 95 – Temple, Taylor	
1.000 mi = 1.609 km; 1.000 km = 0.621 mi: Concurrency terminus
