= Buchanan Dam, Texas =

- Census-designated place
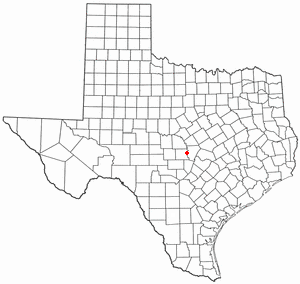
- Location of Buchanan Dam, Texas

- Coordinates: 30°45′52″N 98°25′15″W
- Country: United States
- State: Texas
- County: Llano

Area
  - Total: 20.22 sq mi (52.38 km^{2})
  - Land: 7.75 sq mi (20.06 km^{2})
  - Water: 12.48 sq mi (32.32 km^{2})
- Elevation: 1,017 ft (310 m)

Population (2020)
  - Total: 1,508
  - Density: 194.7/sq mi (75.17/km^{2})
- Time zone: UTC-6 (Central (CST))
  - Summer (DST): UTC-5 (CDT)
- ZIP code: 78609
- Area code: 512
- FIPS code: 48-10984
- GNIS feature ID: 2407917

Buchanan Dam (/bəkˈhænən/ bək-HAN-ən) is a census-designated place (CDP) in Llano County, Texas, United States. As of the 2020 census, Buchanan Dam had a population of 1,508.

== Geography ==
Buchanan Dam is located in northeastern Llano County on the west and south shores of Lake Buchanan, a reservoir on the Colorado River. The CDP also occupies the south and west shores of Inks Lake, on the Colorado directly downstream from Lake Buchanan. It extends north along Lake Buchanan as far as Bluffton.

Texas State Highway 29 passes through the southern part of the CDP, crossing the Colorado River just south of the Buchanan Dam. Highway 29 leads east 13 miles (21 km) to Burnet and west 16 miles (26 km) to Llano. State Highway 261 leads north from Highway 29 up the west side of Lake Buchanan 8 miles (13 km) to Bluffton.

According to the United States Census Bureau, the Buchanan Dam CDP has a total area of 20.2 square miles (52.4 km^{2}), of which 7.8 square miles (20.1 km^{2}) are land and 12.5 square miles (32.3 km^{2}), or 61.70%, are water.

=== Climate ===
The climate in this area is characterized by hot, humid summers and generally mild to cool winters. According to the Köppen Climate Classification system, Buchanan Dam has a humid subtropical climate, abbreviated "Cfa" on climate maps.

== Demographics ==
Historical population
Census	Pop.	Note	%±
1990	1,099		—
2000	1,688		53.6%
2010	1,519		−10.0%
2020	1,508		−0.7%
U.S. Decennial Census; 1850–1900 1910; 1920 1930 1940; 1950 1960 1970; 1980 1990 2000; 2010

Buchanan Dam first appeared as a census-designated place in the 1990 U.S. census.

=== 2020 census ===
Buchanan Dam CDP, Texas – Racial and ethnic composition Note: the US Census treats Hispanic/Latino as an ethnic category. This table excludes Latinos from the racial categories and assigns them to a separate category. Hispanics/Latinos may be of any race.
Race / Ethnicity (NH = Non-Hispanic)	Pop 2000	Pop 2010	Pop 2020	% 2000	% 2010	% 2020
White alone (NH)	1,578	1,401	1,310	93.48%	92.23%	86.87%
Black or African American alone (NH)	6	3	4	0.36%	0.20%	0.27%
Native American or Alaska Native alone (NH)	1	2	4	0.06%	0.13%	0.27%
Asian alone (NH)	1	6	12	0.06%	0.39%	0.80%
Native Hawaiian or Pacific Islander alone (NH)	0	3	0	0.00%	0.20%	0.00%
Other race alone (NH)	0	0	1	0.00%	0.00%	0.07%
Mixed race or Multiracial (NH)	12	9	64	0.71%	0.59%	4.24%
Hispanic or Latino (any race)	90	95	113	5.33%	6.25%	7.49%
Total	1,688	1,519	1,508	100.00%	100.00%	100.00%

As of the 2020 United States census, there were 1,508 people, 642 households, and 451 families residing in the CDP.

=== 2000 census ===
As of the census of 2000, there were 1,688 people, 848 households, and 545 families residing in the CDP. The population density was 221.7 inhabitants per square mile (85.6/km^{2}). There were 1,294 housing units at an average density of 170.0 per square mile (65.6/km^{2}). The racial makeup of the CDP was 97.16% White, 0.36% African American, 0.06% Native American, 0.06% Asian, 1.48% from other races, and 0.89% from two or more races. Hispanics or Latinos of any race were 5.33% of the population.

Of the 848 households, 11.0% had children under the age of 18 living with them, 57.1% were married couples living together, 4.5% had a female householder with no husband present, and 35.7% were not families. About 31.4% of all households were made up of individuals, and 13.8% had someone living alone who was 65 years of age or older. The average household size was 1.99 and the average family size was 2.43.

In the CDP, the population was distributed as 11.9% under the age of 18, 3.7% from 18 to 24, 16.4% from 25 to 44, 35.0% from 45 to 64, and 32.9% who were 65 years of age or older. The median age was 56 years. For every 100 females, there were 98.6 males. For every 100 females age 18 and over, there were 101.5 males.

The median income for a household in the CDP was $32,586, and for a family was $41,216. Males had a median income of $39,286 versus $23,580 for females. The per capita income for the CDP was $25,812. About 5.7% of families and 8.5% of the population were below the poverty line, including 16.5% of those under age 18 and 2.0% of those age 65 or over.

== Education ==
Buchanan Dam is served by the Burnet Consolidated Independent School District.
