= Ranch to Market Road 1431 =

State road in Texas, United States

Ranch to Market Road 1431

Route information
- Maintained by TxDOT
- Length: 66.702 mi (107.346 km)
- Existed: 1951–present

Major junctions
- West end: SH 261 near Lake Buchanan
- SH 29; US 281 in Marble Falls; US 183 in Cedar Park
- East end: I-35 in Round Rock

Location
- Country: United States
- State: Texas
- Counties: Llano, Burnet, Travis, Williamson

Highway system
- Highways in Texas; Interstate; US; State; Former; Toll; Loops; Spurs; FM/RM; Park; Rec
← FM 1430	→ FM 1432

Ranch to Market Road 1431 (RM 1431) is a 66.702-mile (107.346 km) ranch to market road in Texas, United States, that connects Austin with rural areas of Central Texas.

== Route description ==
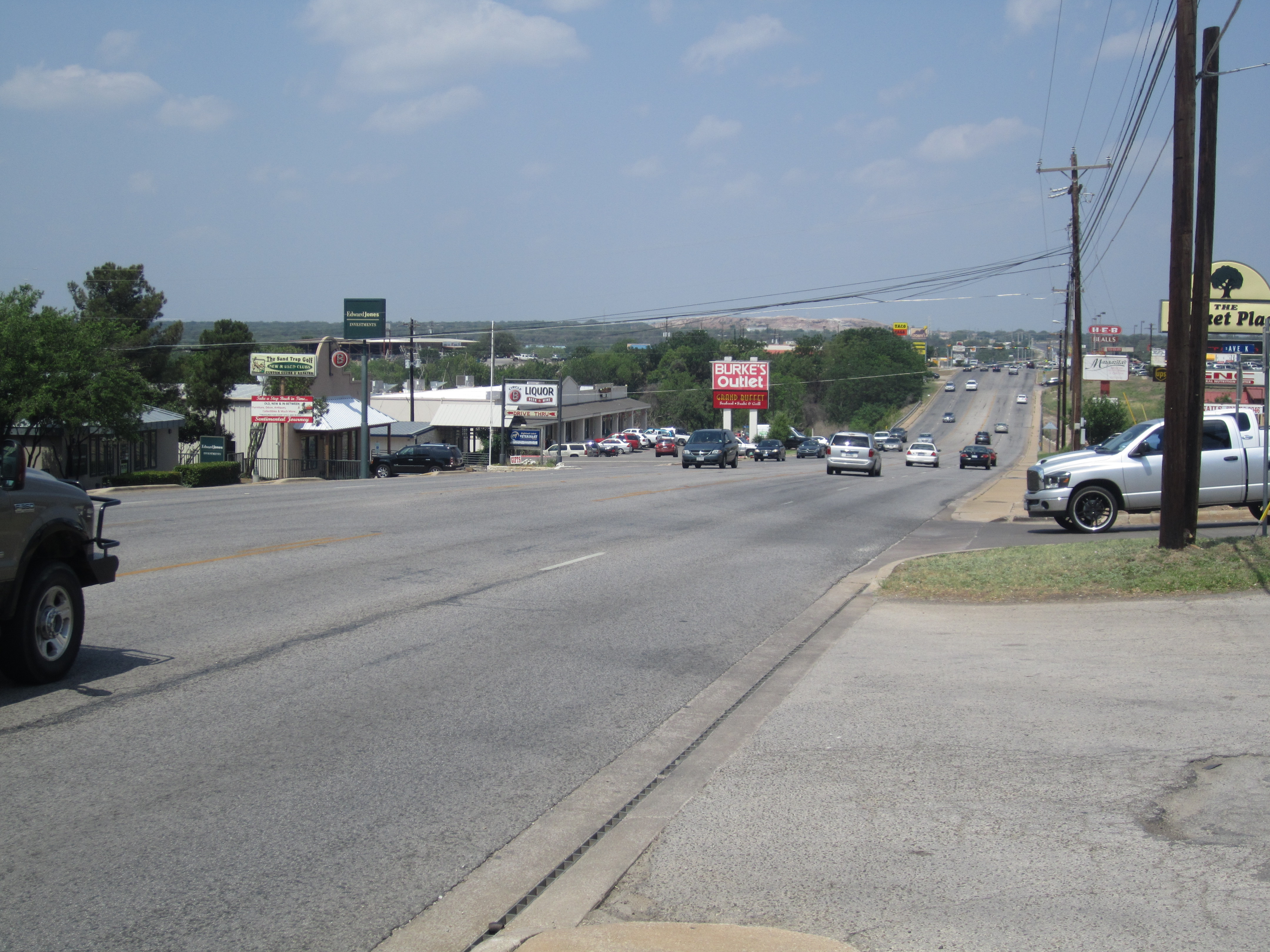
West along RM 1431 in Marble Falls, April 2011

The western terminus of RM 1431 is in Llano County, at an intersection with SH 261 along the southwestern shore of Lake Buchanan. The roadway initially travels to the southwest, crossing SH 29, before turning to the south and into Kingsland. After crossing into Burnet County, RM 1431 takes a more southeasterly path through Granite Shoals and Marble Falls, where it crosses US 281. The highway continues east and roughly parallels Lake Travis to its south, crossing into Travis County and passing through the cities of Lago Vista and Jonestown. RM 1431 then enters Cedar Park in Williamson County, where it has intersections with US 183, the 183A Toll Road, and FM 734 (Parmer Lane). The route heads east into Round Rock, Texas, where it reaches its eastern terminus at Interstate 35's exit 256. The roadway continues into Round Rock as University Boulevard.

== History ==
Farm to Market Road 1431 (FM 1431) was originally designated in Starr County on July 15, 1949, on a route from FM 755 eastward to La Reforma at the Hidalgo County line. That designation was canceled on November 30, 1949, and the route was combined with FM 1017.

The current route was first designated on May 23, 1951, as FM 1431, and ran from US 281 in Marble Falls to the community of Smithwick approximately 11.3 miles (18.2 km) to the east. The designation was changed to RM 1431 on October 1, 1956. The route was extended westward into Llano County and to SH 29 on November 21, 1956. It was extended eastward to Travis Peak Road on October 31, 1958, and further east to US 183 in White Stone (now part of Cedar Park) on November 26, 1958, replacing RM 1328. RM 1431 was extended to its current western terminus at SH 261 on September 5, 1973, and to its current eastern terminus at I-35 on June 21, 1978.

Officially, a 1.1-mile (1.8 km) segment of the route along Whitestone Boulevard in Cedar Park was transferred to the jurisdiction of the city on January 28, 2010.

== Major intersections ==
County	Location	mi	km	Destinations	Notes
Llano		0.0	0.0	SH 261	Western terminus
Llano		2.1	3.4	SH 29 – Llano, Burnet	
Llano		5.4	8.7	RM 3404	
Llano	Kingsland	7.0	11.3	RM 2545	
Llano	Kingsland	7.6	12.2	RM 2900	
Burnet		8.8	14.2	RM 2342 – Longhorn Cavern State Park	
Burnet		17.9	28.8	FM 1980	
Burnet	Marble Falls	20.3	32.7	US 281 – Johnson City, Burnet	
Burnet		30.2	48.6	FM Bus. 1431 east	
Burnet		30.6	49.2	FM Bus. 1431 west	
Burnet		32.6	52.5	RM 1174 – Bertram, Balcones Canyonlands N.W.R.	
Travis	No major junctions				
Williamson	Cedar Park	58.1	93.5	US 183 (Bell Boulevard) – Austin, Leander	
Williamson	Cedar Park	59.0	95.0	183A Toll Road – Austin, Leander	
Williamson	Cedar Park	61.1	98.3	FM 734 (Parmer Lane) / Ronald Reagan Boulevard	
Williamson	Round Rock	66.7	107.3	I-35 – Austin, Waco	Eastern terminus; I-35 exit 256; continues as University Boulevard
1.000 mi = 1.609 km; 1.000 km = 0.621 mi

== Business route ==
Business Farm to Market Road 1431-J
- Location: Burnet County
- Length: 0.5 mi (800 m)
- Existed: 2010–present

RM 1431 has one auxiliary route, Business Farm to Market Road 1431-J (Bus. FM 1431-J), (Note: The business route is designated as a Business Farm to Market Road, despite its parent route being a Ranch to Market Road. The distinction is inconsequential as the term "Farm Road" or "Ranch Road" is replaced with "Business" on route markers.) designated along a former alignment of RM 1431 in Burnet County east of Marble Falls. The 0.5-mile (0.8 km) business route was created in 2010 and serves the community of Smithwick. The route was created when RM 1431 was aligned along a more direct path from west to east bypassing the business route's more southerly dip. The business route intersects no other numbered state highways between its termini with RM 1431.

== See also ==
- List of Farm to Market Roads in Texas
