= Texas State Highway 261 =

State highway in Texas

State Highway 261
- SH 261, highlighted in red

Route information
- Maintained by TxDOT
- Length: 8.579 mi (13.807 km)
- Existed: 1938–present

Major junctions
- South end: SH 29 at Buchanan Dam
- North end: RM 2241 at Bluffton

Location
- Country: United States
- State: Texas

Highway system
- Highways in Texas; Interstate; US; State; Former; Toll; Loops; Spurs; FM/RM; Park; Rec
← SH 260	→ SH 262

State Highway 261 (SH 261) is a Texas state highway running from SH 29 north along the western side of Lake Buchanan to the old location of SH 29 at Bluffton. This route was designated on March 21, 1938. On August 30, 1957, SH 261 was extended west 1 mile over part of RM 2241, which was rerouted north over RM 2337 so that there was one continuous RM road, rather than two, between Llano and Tow.

== Junction list ==
The entire route is in Llano County.

Location	mi	km	Destinations	Notes
Buchanan Dam			SH 29	
			RM 1431	
Bluffton			RM 2241	
1.000 mi = 1.609 km; 1.000 km = 0.621 mi
