= Tow, Texas =

Unincorporated community in Texas, US

Coordinates: 30°52′41″N 98°27′48″W

Tow (/taʊ/, rhymes with "cow") is a small unincorporated community in Llano County, Texas, United States. As of the 2020 census, Tow had a population of 226.

Tow was a thriving community, until the central Texas drought that started in 2007. It then lost about half of its population, forcing many businesses to shut down.

As of 2018, Tow is more active now that the lake is full, and businesses once shut down have begun to reopen.

== Geography ==
Tow is located on Ranch to Market Road 2241, about 61 miles (98 km) northwest of Austin, 20 miles (32 km) northeast of Llano, and on the western shore of Lake Buchanan.

=== Climate ===
The climate in this area is characterized by hot, humid summers and generally mild to cool winters. According to the Köppen climate classification, Tow has a humid subtropical climate, Cfa on climate maps.

== History ==
Tow, which is the oldest community in the county, began with the arrival in 1852 of David and Gideon Cowan and their mother, Ruth, originally from Tennessee. The Cowans were directed by local Indians to a salt bed near the Colorado River, which they developed into a successful saltworks. Significant not only in the local economy, the Bluffton-Tow Salt Works was also known as the Confederate States of America Salt Works for its contribution to the Confederate cause. The operation was destroyed by the "salt works cyclone" in 1871. John F. Morgan arrived in the area with his family in 1853 and soon established a hat business, using beaver and other fur trapped locally. When the Tow brothers, William and Wilson, arrived with their families in 1853, they named the nearby area in which they settled Tow Valley. A post office was established there in 1886 as Tow with Mathew B. Clendenen as postmaster. Tow grew rapidly in the 1970s and 1980s with the addition of retirement and recreation to its economic base. From a population of 50 before 1950, the lakeside town had grown to 305 by 1974, when it had a post office and numerous businesses. In 2000, the population was still 305; 31 businesses were reported.

== Demographics ==
Historical population
Census	Pop.	Note	%±
2020	226		—
U.S. Decennial Census; 1850–1900 1910; 1920 1930 1940; 1950 1960 1970; 1980 1990 2000; 2010 2020

Tow first appeared as a census-designated place in the 2020 U.S. census.

=== 2020 census ===
Tow CDP, Texas – Racial and ethnic composition Note: the US Census treats Hispanic/Latino as an ethnic category. This table excludes Latinos from the racial categories and assigns them to a separate category. Hispanics/Latinos may be of any race.
Race / Ethnicity (NH = Non-Hispanic)	Pop 2020	% 2020
White alone (NH)	207	91.59%
Black or African American alone (NH)	0	0.00%
Native American or Alaska Native alone (NH)	0	0.00%
Asian alone (NH)	0	0.00%
Native Hawaiian or Pacific Islander alone (NH)	0	0.00%
Other race alone (NH)	1	0.44%
Mixed race or Multiracial (NH)	7	3.10%
Hispanic or Latino (any race)	11	4.87%
Total	226	100.00%

== Education ==
Like other small towns surrounding Llano, Tow is served by the Llano Independent School District, but some areas are served by the Burnet Consolidated Independent School District.

== See also ==
- Texas Hill Country
