= Buchanan Lake Village, Texas =

- Census-designated place
- Location within Texas Location within the United States
- Coordinates: 30°51′24″N 98°26′16″W
- Country: United States
- State: Texas
- County: Llano

Area
  - Total: 3.325 sq mi (8.61 km^{2})
  - Land: 1.488 sq mi (3.85 km^{2})
  - Water: 1.837 sq mi (4.76 km^{2})
- Elevation: 1,017 ft (310 m)

Population (2010)
  - Total: 692
  - Density: 465/sq mi (180/km^{2})
- Time zone: UTC-6 (Central (CST))
  - Summer (DST): UTC-5 (CDT)
- Area code: 325
- GNIS feature ID: 2586913

Buchanan Lake Village is an unincorporated community and census-designated place in Llano County, Texas, United States. As of the 2020 census, Buchanan Lake Village had a population of 720.

== Geography ==
According to the U.S. Census Bureau, the community has an area of 3.325 square miles (8.61 km^{2}); 1.488 square miles (3.85 km^{2}) of its area is land, and 1.837 square miles (4.76 km^{2}) is water.

The community is situated on the shores of Lake Buchanan.

== Demographics ==
Historical population
Census	Pop.	Note	%±
2010	692		—
2020	720		4.0%
U.S. Decennial Census; 1850–1900 1910; 1920 1930 1940; 1950 1960 1970; 1980 1990 2000; 2010 2020

Buchanan Lake Village first appeared as a census designated place in the 2010 U.S. census.

Buchanan Lake Village CDP, Texas – Racial and ethnic composition Note: the US Census treats Hispanic/Latino as an ethnic category. This table excludes Latinos from the racial categories and assigns them to a separate category. Hispanics/Latinos may be of any race.
Race / Ethnicity (NH = Non-Hispanic)	Pop 2010	Pop 2020	% 2010	% 2020
White alone (NH)	666	625	96.24%	86.81%
Black or African American alone (NH)	1	2	0.14%	0.28%
Native American or Alaska Native alone (NH)	1	7	0.14%	0.97%
Asian alone (NH)	3	3	0.43%	0.42%
Native Hawaiian or Pacific Islander alone (NH)	0	0	0.00%	0.00%
Other race alone (NH)	0	3	0.00%	0.42%
Mixed race or Multiracial (NH)	5	44	0.72%	6.11%
Hispanic or Latino (any race)	16	36	2.31%	5.00%
Total	692	720	100.00%	100.00%
