= Buchanan Dam =

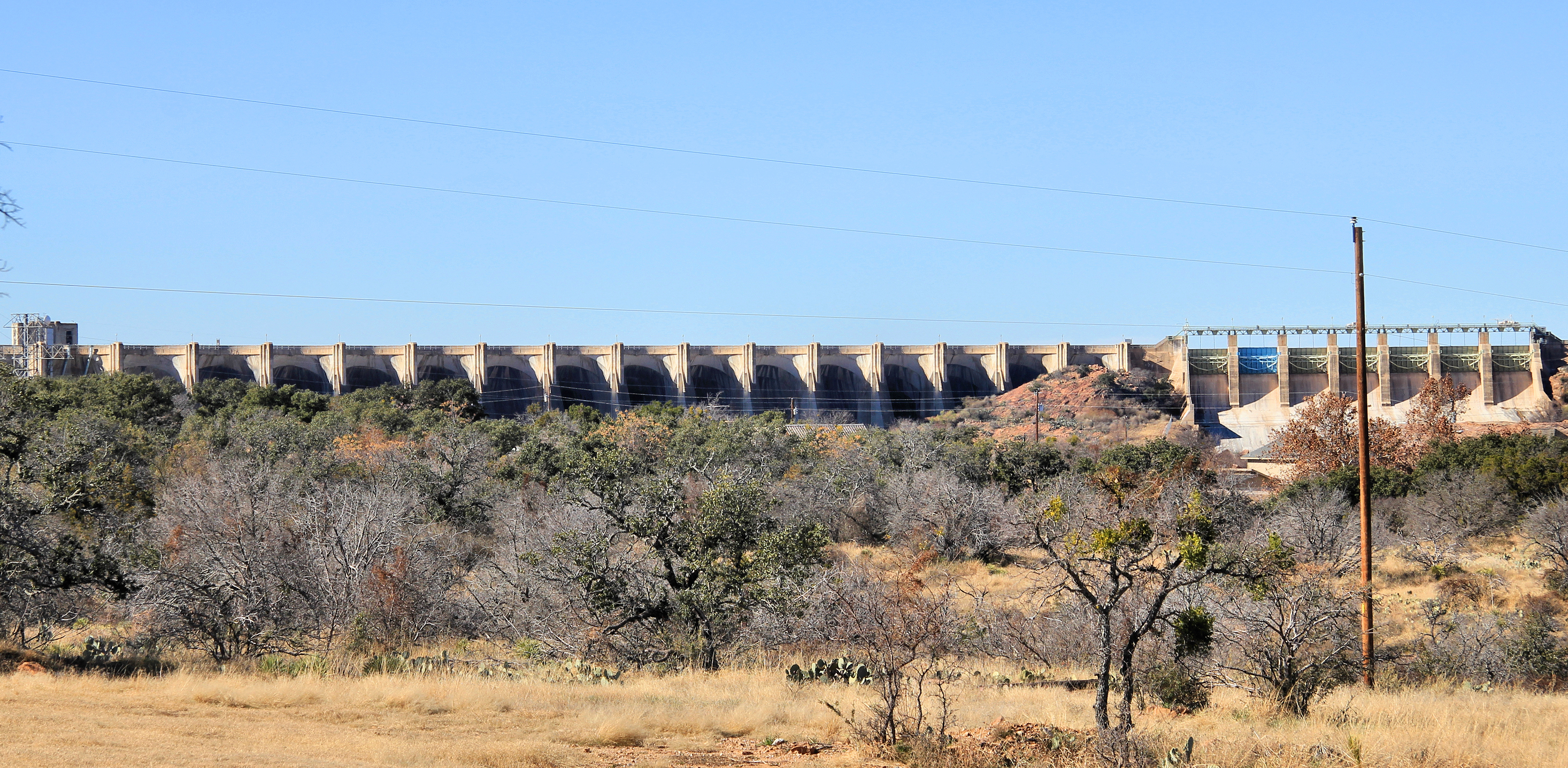
- Buchanan Dam showing multi-arch structure and a set of floodgates

- Location within Texas
- Interactive map of Buchanan Dam
- Official name: Buchanan Dam
- Location: Burnet / Llano counties, Texas, U.S.
- Coordinates: 30.7514°N 98.4183°W
- Construction began: 1931
- Opening date: 1937
- Operator: Lower Colorado River Authority

Dam and spillways
- Impounds: Colorado River
- Height: 145.5 feet (44.3 m)
- Length: 10,987.6 feet (3,349.0 m)
- Width (base): 215.1 feet (65.6 m)
- Spillway type: 37 controlled, bulkhead-gates
- Spillway capacity: 347,300 cu ft/s (9,830 m^{3}/s) (7 floodgates at 18,800 cfs; 30 floodgates at 7,000 cfs, 3 turbines at 1,900 cfs)

Reservoir
- Creates: Lake Buchanan

Power Station
- Turbines: 3
- Installed capacity: 54.9 MW

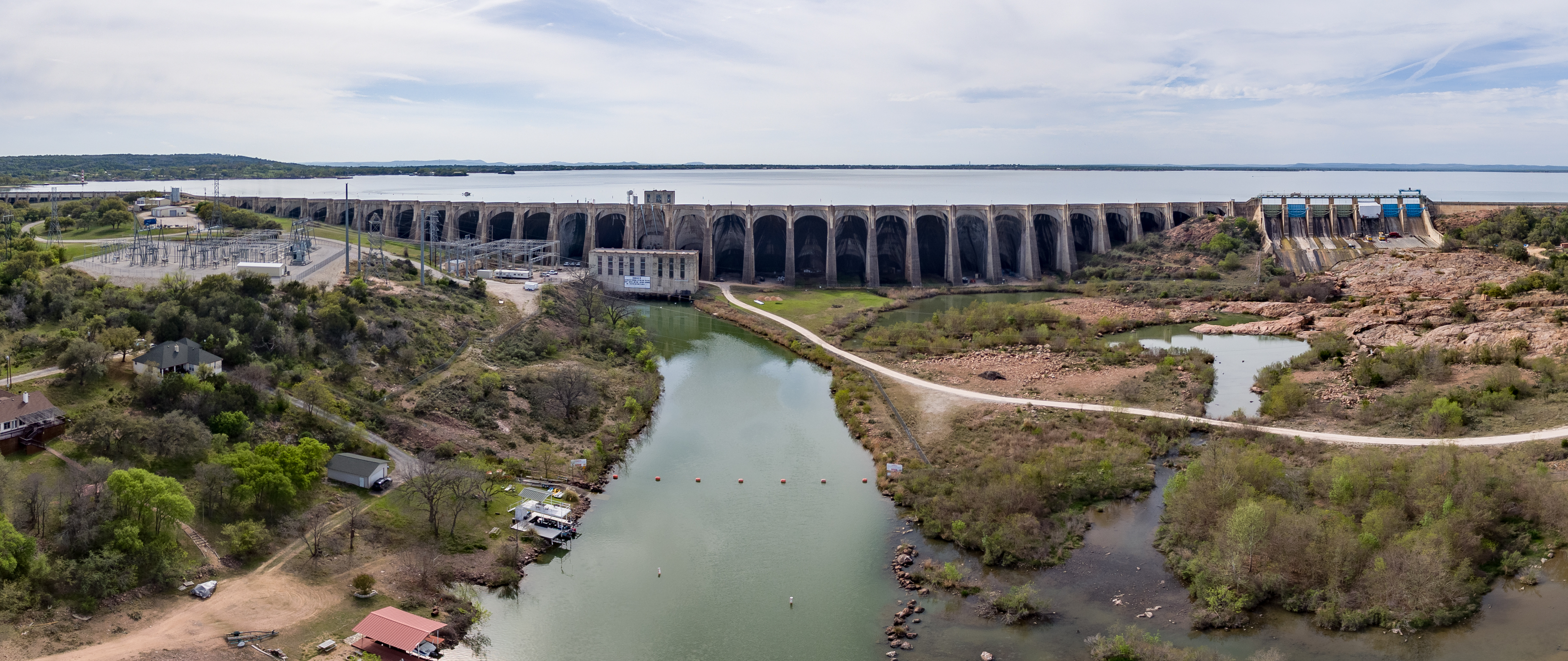
An aerial view of Buchanan Dam.

The Buchanan Dam (/bəˈkænən/) is a multiple arch dam located on the Colorado River of Texas. The dam forms Lake Buchanan and was the first dam to be completed in the chain of Texas Highland Lakes. The dam is used for generating hydroelectric power and for flood control and is located about 12 miles (19 km) west of Burnet, Texas.

== History ==
Construction of the then-named George W. Hamilton Dam was started in 1931 by a company controlled by Samuel Insull, but soon ended with the dam less than half completed when his highly leveraged public utility holding company collapsed during the Great Depression. In 1934, the Texas legislature authorized the formation of the Lower Colorado River Authority to complete the Hamilton dam. Following completion in 1937, the dam was renamed for U.S. Representative James P. Buchanan, who helped obtain federal funding for the project from the Public Works Administration.

Construction of the dam required the relocation of the town of Bluffton, Texas. Relocation began in 1931 and was complete by 1939. A 2011 drought re-exposed the old Bluffton townsite.

Following a flood along the river in 1938, in which the dam was required to pass through all of the flow of water, there was criticism of the dam project as failing to meet its promise of preventing downstream floods. However, at the time it was pointed out that the Buchanan Dam was just the first in a series of four flood control dams, and that prevention of flooding would not be possible until they were finished.

== See also ==
- Project Travois
