= Enchanted Rock State Natural Area =

State natural area in Gillespie and Llano County, Texas

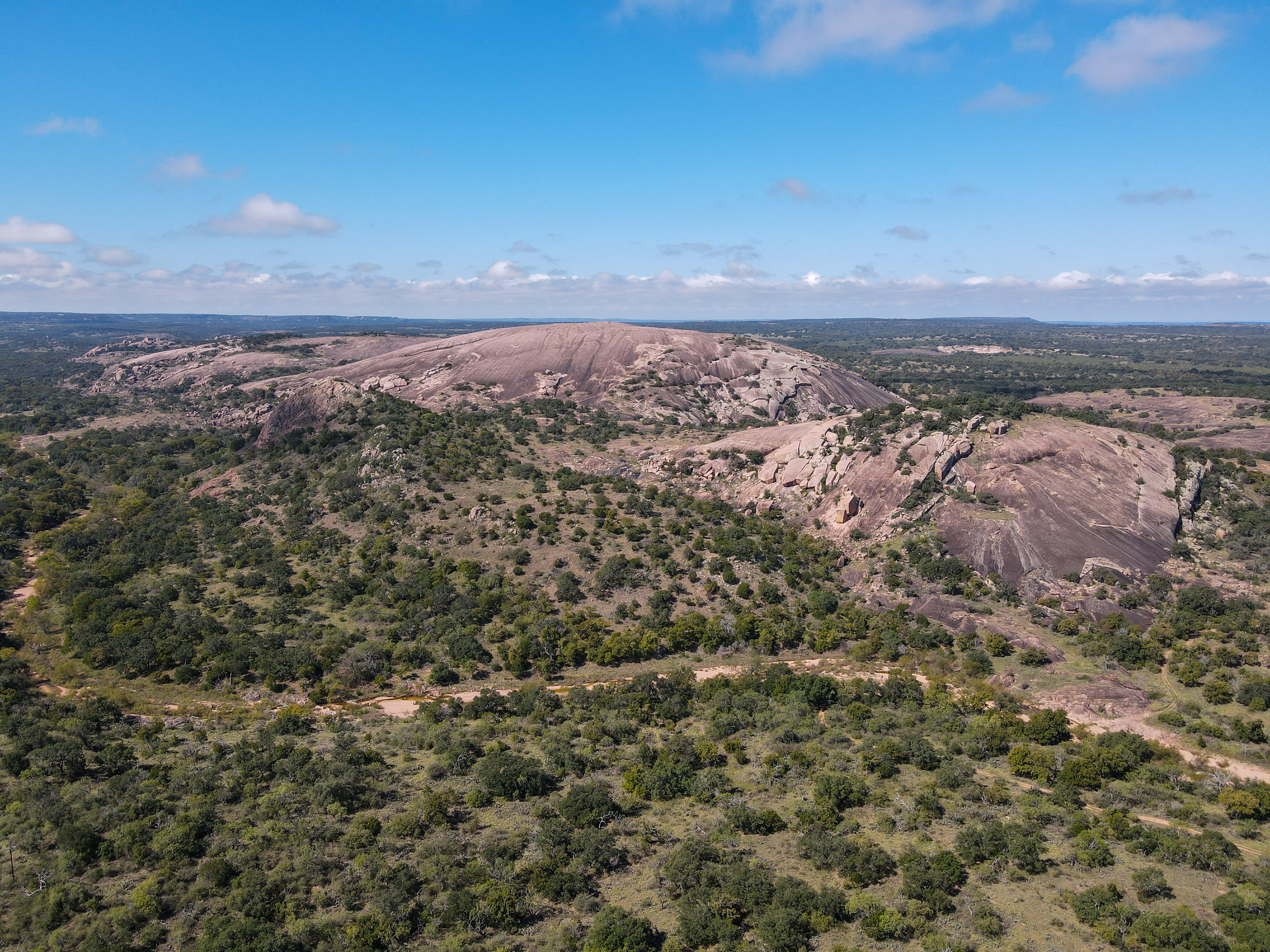
- Enchanted Rock and surrounding area

- Location within Texas Location within the United States
- Location: Gillespie County, Texas; Llano County, Texas
- Nearest city: Fredericksburg, Texas
- Coordinates: 30°29′46″N 98°49′12″W
- Area: 5,388 acres (2,180 ha)
- Created: 1978
- Visitors: 306,302 (in 2025)
- Governing body: Texas Parks and Wildlife Department
- Website: Official site
Enchanted Rock State Natural Area
- Map of Enchanted Rock's original boundaries (red), the August 2024 expansion (green), the January 2025 expansion (blue) and the May 2022 expansion (gray). The black line is the boundary between Llano (north) and Gillespie (south) Counties and the jagged blue line is the route of Sandy Creek

Enchanted Rock State Natural Area is a 5,388-acre (2,180 ha) nature reserve in Gillespie and Llano counties, Texas, United States. It opened in 1984 and is managed by the Texas Parks and Wildlife Department (TPWD). Enchanted Rock, a 425-foot-high pink granite batholith, is the main feature of the park.

== History ==
Enchanted Rock was held privately for over a century. The Nature Conservancy purchased 1,640.5 acres (664 ha) including Enchanted Rock for $1.3 million to prevent private development. The Nature Conservancy transferred the land to TPWD, and the state purchased an additional 3 acres (1 ha). After building out facilities, Enchanted Rock State Natural Area opened in 1984. In May 2022 TPWD approved the purchase of 41 acres (17 ha) due south of the original boundaries of Enchanted Rock State Natural Area TPWD added 630 acres (255 ha) in September 2024 and formally announced a 3,073-acre (1,244 ha) acquisition on January 13, 2025. The funds for the last two purchases came from the $1 billion Centennial Parks Conservation Fund, which was created in 2023 during the 88th Texas Legislature with the passage of Texas Senate Joint Resolution 74 (SJR 74). and voter approval of an amendment to the Constitution of Texas.

== Nature ==
=== Animals ===
Wildlife in Enchanted Rock State Natural Area includes white-tailed deer, ringtail, Mexican long-nosed armadillo, rock and eastern fox squirrel, eastern cottontail, and red harvester ants. A wide variety of lizards, including the Texas horned lizard, also make the Enchanted Rock area their home. Vernal pools on the rock contain fragile invertebrate fairy shrimp.

Designated a key bird watching site, bird enthusiasts can observe many species including wild turkey, greater roadrunner, golden-fronted woodpecker, Woodhouse's scrub jay, canyon towhee, rufous-crowned sparrow, black-throated sparrow, lesser goldfinch, common poorwill, chuck-will's-widow, black-chinned hummingbird, vermilion flycatcher, scissor-tailed flycatcher, Bell's vireo, yellow-throated vireo, blue grosbeak, painted bunting, orchard oriole, vesper sparrow, fox sparrow, Harris's sparrow, northern cardinal, canyon wren, and lark sparrow.

=== Plants ===
More than 500 species of plants, from four chief plant communities; open oak woodland, mesquite grassland, floodplain, and granite rock community are found in the reserve. Specific species include plateau live oak, Texas beargrass, prickly pear cactus, and sideoats grama.

== Activities ==
Hiking the Summit Trail is the most popular activity in the park. Other activities include camping, picnicking, rock climbing, bouldering, caving, primitive backpacking, birdwatching, geocaching and nature study.

The Granite Gripper is an annual rock climbing competition that acts as a fundraiser for park conservation through the Friends of Enchanted Rock. Emphasis is placed on activity safety and ecological preservation.

Stargazing is available as Enchanted Rock State Natural Area is an International Dark Sky Park, certified by DarkSky International. The park monitors sky brightness with a sky quality meter, and offers nighttime events like star parties. On new moon nights, the park has Bortle 3 skies; the milky way is fully visible, meteors are common, and the human eye can see more than 6000 stars.

== See also ==
- List of Texas state parks
