= Packsaddle Mountain (Llano County, Texas) =

Mountain in Texas, United States

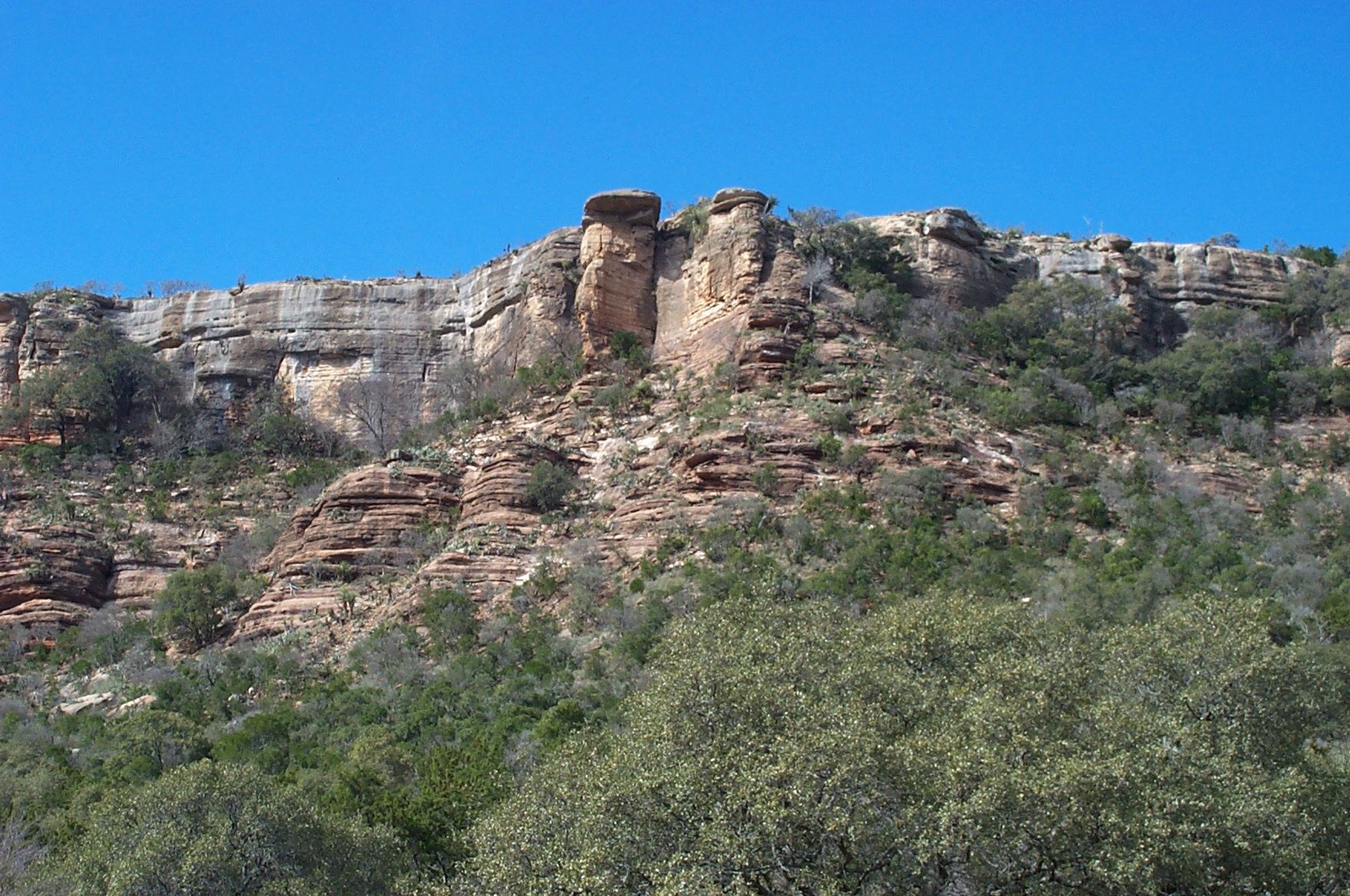
- Packsaddle Mountain Cliff Face

Highest point
- Elevation: 1,628 ft (496 m)
- Prominence: 548 ft (167 m)
- Parent peak: Enchanted Rock
- Coordinates: 30°37′14″N 98°30′29″W

Geography
- Location within Texas
- Location: Llano County, Texas, U.S.
- Parent range: Llano Uplift
- Topo map: USGS Cap Mountain

Named after the saddle-like appearance provided by twin peaks, Packsaddle Mountain is a landmark hill that stands five miles southwest of Kingsland, Texas in eastern Llano County on State Highway 71 and is of interest to both historians and geologists. In 1873 it was the site of the Battle of Packsaddle Mountain, the last major Native American battle in the area. The mountain is now part of a large ranch called Packsaddle Ranch.

== History ==
It is thought that the Spanish mined the mountain for gold prior to the Texas Revolution and that it was the site of Los Almagres, Jim Bowie’s famous lost mine. Prospecting on Packsaddle Mountain renewed interest in gold mining in Llano County in the 1920s, but with no lasting result.

The mountain was the site of the Packsaddle Mountain Fight with 21 Apache Tribesmen on August 4, 1873 and was the last major Indian battle in the area. The fight on Packsaddle Mountain was precipitated when a cow from the Moss Ranch (in what is now Llano County) was found with an arrow sticking out of her side. A party of eight ranchers, including W.B. Moss and his two brothers, was raised to pursue the raiders. They found some twenty-one Apaches encamped on Packsaddle Mountain. In the ensuing fight, at least three tribesmen were killed and at least three ranchers were wounded.

The Texas state historical marker reads "Two and one half miles east on the Packsaddle Mountain, in a battle fought August 4, 1873, Captain J. R. Moss, Stephen B. Moss, William B. Moss, Eli Lloyd, Arch Martin, Pink Ayers, E. D. Harrington, and Robert Brown routed a band of Indians thrice their number. The last Apache battle in this region." The Apache tribes had been encroaching Tonkawa tribal areas for some time.

== Geography ==
At an elevation of 1,628 feet, the higher of the two summits rises 650 feet above Highway 71. Local topography ranges from flat to rolling to steep, with local escarpments, covered with soils ranging from shallow and stony to deep, fine, sandy loam. Vegetation consists primarily of open stands of live oak and Ashe juniper.

== Pictures ==
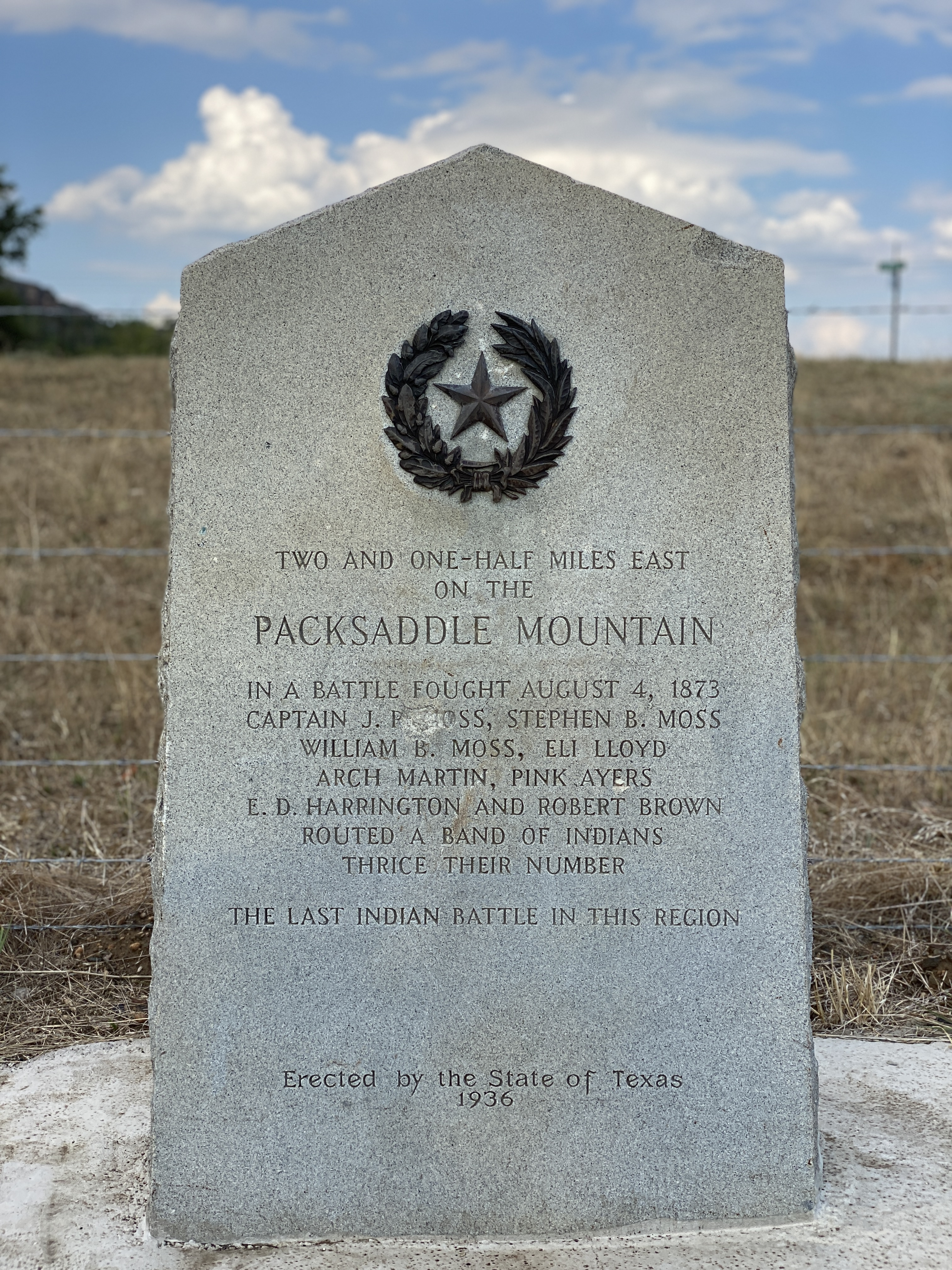
Packsaddle - Mountain Historical Monument

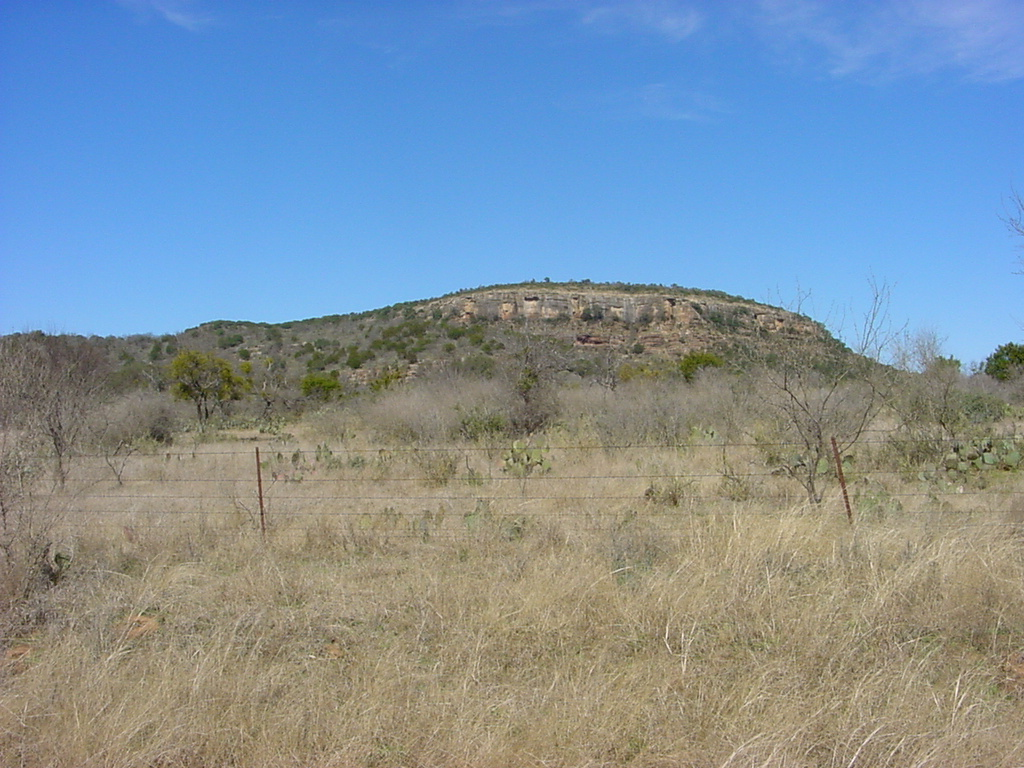
Packsaddle - Mountain View from CR 309

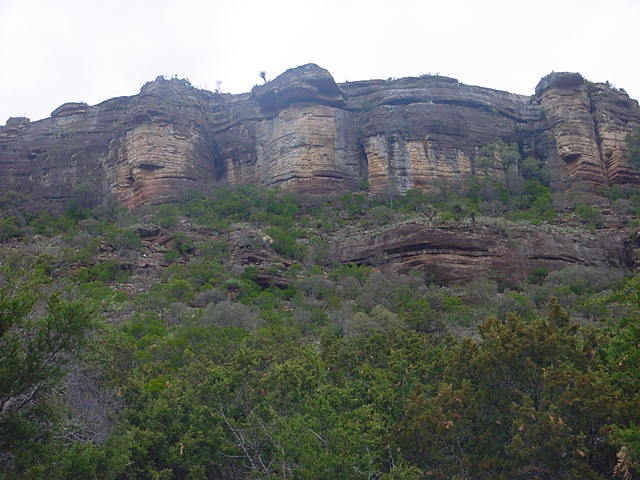
Packsaddle - Close View of Cliff

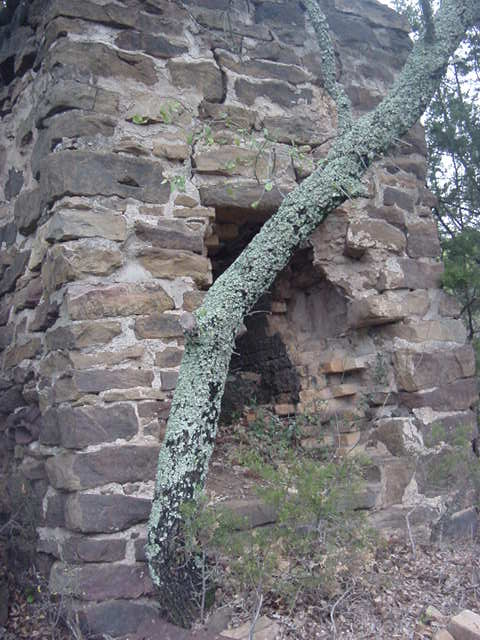
Packsaddle - Old Silver Smelting Furnace

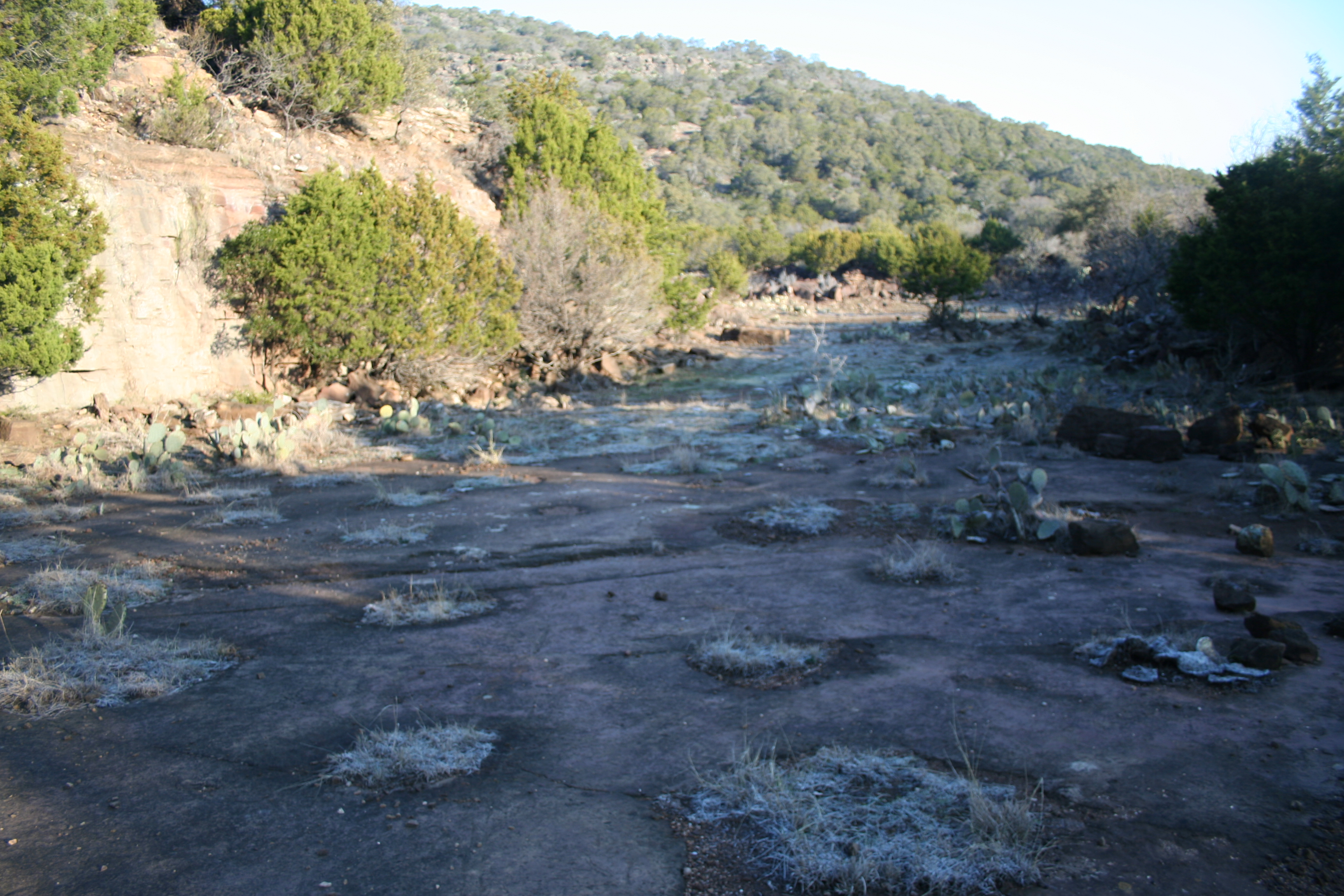
Packsaddle - Old Rock Quarry

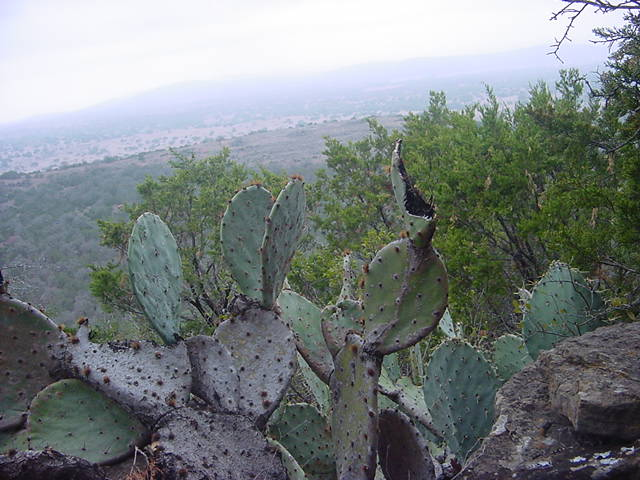
Packsaddle - View towards Llano, TX
