= Click, Texas =

- Ghost town
- Location in Texas Location in the United States
- Coordinates: 30°33′48″N 98°34′26″W
- Country: United States
- State: Texas
- County: Llano
- Elevation: 1,043 ft (318 m)

Population (2000)
  - Total: 20 Handbook of Texas
- Time zone: UTC-6 (Central (CST))
  - Summer (DST): UTC-5 (CDT)
- Area code: 325
- FIPS code: 48
- GNIS feature ID: 1379560

Click is a ghost town in Llano County, Texas, United States, on County Road 308, southeast of Llano and southwest of Kingsland. The community was named for settler Malachi Click. At its peak, the population was 20 people. Benjamin F. Lowe was appointed postmaster when Click got a post office in 1880. The post office was discontinued during World War II.
