= Battle of Packsaddle Mountain =

Battle in Apache Wars

- Part of Texas-Indian Wars
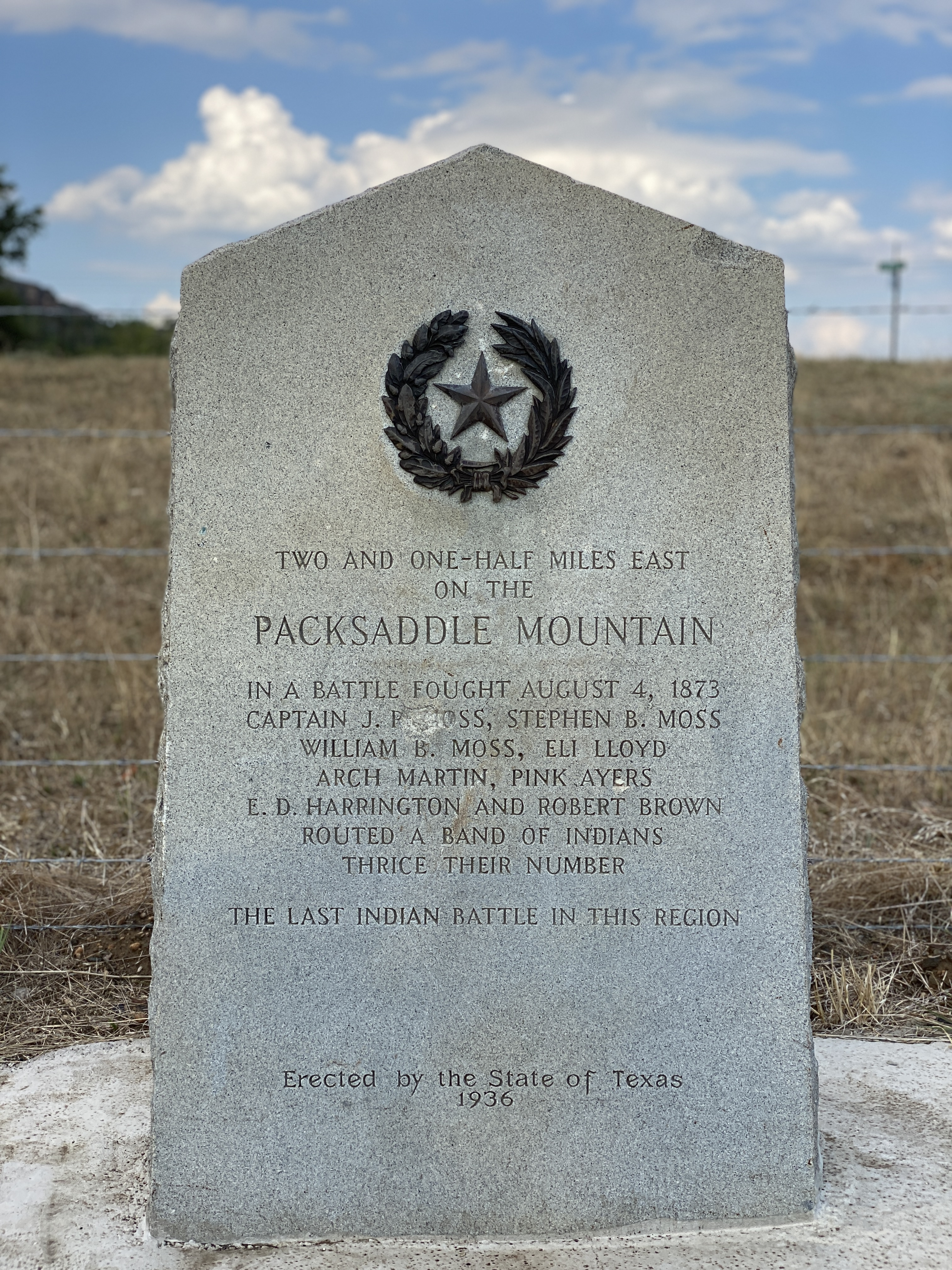
- Historical Marker for the battlefield.
Date	August 4, 1873
Location	Packsaddle Mountain (Llano County, Texas)
Result	U.S victory

Belligerents
United States	Comanches or Apaches

Commanders and leaders
James R. Moss	Unknown chief reported killed

Strength
8 militia	21 warriors

Casualties and losses
4 wounded	3 killed, 2 others found dead near the battlefield later on

== Leading up to the Battle ==
The Battle of Packsaddle Mountain was one of the final battles between Native Americans and the United States in the Texas Hill Country. On August 3, 1873, a local settler of Llano County, Dever Herrington, had seen that one of his cattle had an arrow stuck in it, seemingly causing suspicion that there could be Indians in the area. Because of this, early next morning, Herrington and 7 other ranchers formed a militia in order to chase down the native raiders. The armed men got on their horses and followed the trail which they suspected to be of the Indians. As the trail ended, the men made it to the southern edge of the county, at Packsaddle Mountain. As the men scaled up the peak, they encountered the Indians encamped on a cliff, with some resting and others barbecuing meat. The horses of the Indians were grazing on grass in a small open field area.

== The Battle ==
The militiamen dismounted their steeds, and began to charge the Indian camp, opening fire with precision, forcing the Indians to retreat for a while. After a short time, the natives were back, and attacked once again. Although outnumbered, James Moss and his men’s precision with their shooting ended up winning the battle. The indians ended up retreating after losing all of their supplies, and losing their best shooter.

== Aftermath ==
In the aftermath, the militiamen would have half of their force wounded. W.B. Moss was severely wounded, Arch Martin was shot in his groin, Eli Lloyd has some wounds on his arms, and Pink Ayres was wounded in his hip. On the side of the natives, who are thought to be either Comanche or Apache, had three found dead by the militiamen. However, a few weeks later, another dead Indian was found at the base of the mountain, bringing the death toll to 4. And also after a while, an Indian grave was found near the battlefield, bringing the death total to five on the side of the Indians. After the battle, the militiamen went to a nearby ranch and rested, also having their wounds tended to.
