= 183A Toll Road =

Toll road in Texas, United States

183A Toll Road
- 183A highlighted in red; Currently outdated with new extension to TX 29

Route information
- Maintained by CTRMA
- Length: 13.2 mi (21.2 km)
- Existed: 2007–present

Major junctions
- South end: US 183 / SH 45 Toll / RM 620 in Austin
- RM 1431 in Cedar Park; RM 2243 in Leander; US 183 in Leander
- North end: SH 29 in Liberty Hill

Location
- Country: United States
- State: Texas
- Counties: Williamson

Highway system
- Highways in Texas; Interstate; US; State; Former; Toll; Loops; Spurs; FM/RM; Park; Rec

The 183A Toll Road or 183A is a controlled-access toll road in the Austin metropolitan area of the U.S. state of Texas. The road includes sections in north Austin, Cedar Park, Leander and Liberty Hill It provides a bypass for U.S. Route 183. The road is owned and operated by the Central Texas Regional Mobility Authority. The 183A Toll road is electronic only and has no cash toll booths. Motorists driving without a toll tag will receive a bill in the mail payable within 30 days. The tolled portion of the highway runs from US 183 near SH-45 to SH-29 In Liberty Hill

== Route description ==
The 183A Toll Road starts in Austin at an interchange with US 183 and SH 45. The freeway runs north to a point near Fenway Park where US 183 turns off to the north-northwest. From that location, the toll road runs to the north through an area composed of residential subdivisions. Near Heritage Park, there is an interchange for Whitestone Boulevard near some commercial developments. Near the interchange with RM 2243, 183A turns to the northwest and ends North of SH 29 in Liberty Hill.

== Tolls ==
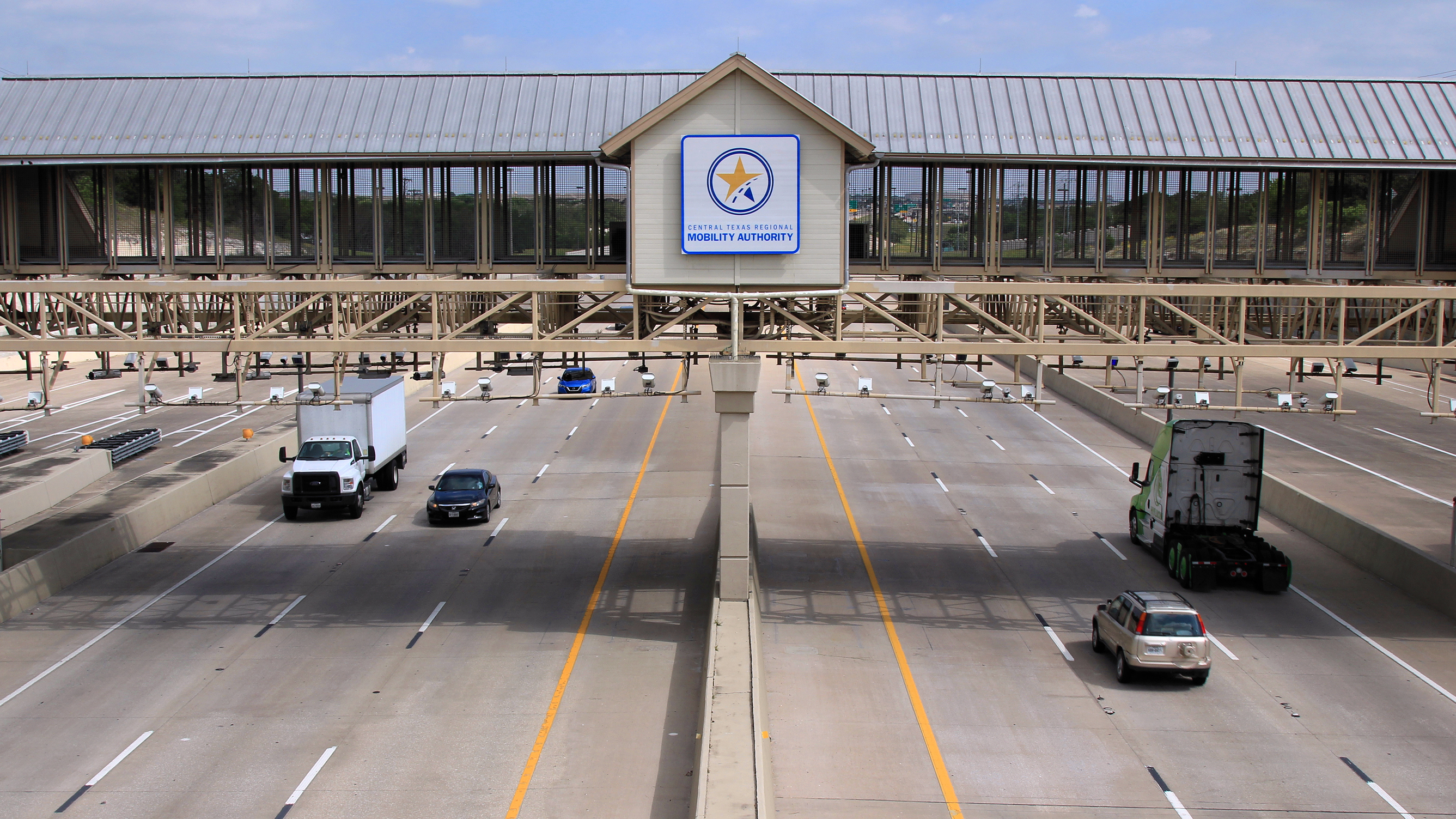
183A Toll Road Park Street mainline toll plaza

Toll locations and rates for passenger cars
| Toll plaza | Pay by mail toll | TxTag toll |
|---|---|---|
| Lakeline Mainline Plaza | $0.86 | $0.57 |
| Park Street Mainline Plaza | $2.91 | $1.94 |
| Brushy Creek Ramps | $0.72 | $0.55 |
| Scottsdale Ramps | $1.64 | $1.11 |
| Crystal Falls Mainline | $1.43 | $2.15 |
| Crystal Falls Ramps | $0.65 | $0.44 |
| San Gabriel Mainline | $1.09 | $1.64 |
| San Gabriel Ramps | $0.76 | $1.14 |
| South Whitewing Ramps | $0.76 | $1.14 |
| Whitewing Mainline | $1.29 | $1.94 |
| North Whitewing Ramps | $1.02 | $1.53 |

=== Violation fees ===
If a TxTag holder (or customer of any other acceptable toll-tag) has a TxTag account with a negative balance, Municipal Services Bureau (MSB) will mail a separate bill with a higher fee.

Violation fees are fees added to an unpaid pay-by-mail bill. An unpaid bill can accrue up to $60 in fees after 90 days.

Toll violation process
| Stage of process | Violation fee | Description | Time frame |
|---|---|---|---|
| Toll bill | $0 | Tolls + processing fee (tolls + $1) | 0–30 days |
| 1st violation notice | $15 | Tolls + processing fee + violation (tolls + $16) | 31–60 days |
| 2nd violation notice | $15 | Tolls + processing fee + violation + 2nd violation (tolls + $31) | 61–90 days |
| Final notice | $30 | Tolls + processing fee + violation + 2nd violation + final notice (tolls + $61) | 91–120 days |

== History ==
The first section of the toll road opened in March 2007 between RM 620 and RM 1431. As initial traffic was higher than expected, the toll road was extended 5 miles to the north. The Phase II extension opened on April 6, 2012 at a cost of $105 million. The 6.6 mile Phase III extension from Hero Way to north of SH 29 in Liberty Hill has been approved. Construction on Phase 3 began in April 2021, and the roadway opened to traffic on April 9, 2025. It will run on the current alignment of US 183 north of Leander.

== Exit list ==
The entire route is in Williamson County. All exits are unnumbered.

| Location | mi | km | Destinations | Notes |
|---|---|---|---|---|
| Austin | 0.0 | 0.0 | US 183 south / SH 45 Toll west / RM 620 east | Southbound exit and northbound entrance |
| Austin | 0.4 | 0.64 | US 183 north / Lakeline Mall Drive | Northbound exit only; last exit before toll plaza; southbound US 183 entrance is from Lakeline Boulevard |
| Cedar Park | | | Northbound toll plaza | |
| Cedar Park | 0.9 | 1.4 | Lakeline Boulevard | Southbound exit is via Avery Ranch Boulevard; last free exit |
| Cedar Park | | | Southbound toll plaza | |
| Cedar Park | 1.4 | 2.3 | US 183 / Avery Ranch Boulevard | Northern end of US 183 concurrency |
| Cedar Park | 2.7 | 4.3 | Brushy Creek Road / Cypress Creek Road | |
| Cedar Park | | | Toll plaza | |
| Cedar Park | 4.3 | 6.9 | RM 1431 (Whitestone Boulevard) – Round Rock, Cedar Park | No direct southbound exit (signed at New Hope Drive); access to Cedar Park Regional Medical Center |
| Cedar Park | 5.1 | 8.2 | New Hope Drive | |
| Cedar Park | 6.1 | 9.8 | Scottsdale Drive | Direct northbound exit only (southbound exit signed at Crystal Falls Parkway) |
| Cedar Park | | | Toll plaza | |
| Cedar Park | 7.1 | 11.4 | Crystal Falls Parkway | |
| Leander | 8.5 | 13.7 | RM 2243 | |
| Leander | 8.9 | 14.3 | Hero Way | Direct southbound exit and northbound entrance |
| Leander | 9.9 | 15.9 | San Gabriel Parkway | Former north end of tollway; opened on April 9, 2025 |
| Leander | | | Toll plaza | |
| Leander | 10.7 | 17.2 | US 183 south / Bryson Ridge Trail | Opened on April 9, 2025 |
| Leander | 12.3 | 19.8 | Whitewing Drive / Larkspur Park Boulevard | Opened on April 9, 2025 |
| | | | Toll plaza | |
| Liberty Hill | 13.2 | 21.2 | US 183 north / SH 29 – Burnet, Georgetown | Opened on April 9, 2025 |
| Liberty Hill | 16.0 | 25.7 | US 183 north / CR 258 – Lampasas | Northern terminus |
1.000 mi = 1.609 km; 1.000 km = 0.621 mi: Concurrency terminus; Incomplete access
