= 2011 North American heat wave =

Weather event in North America

The 2011 North American heat wave was a deadly summer 2011 heat wave that affected the Southern Plains, the Midwestern United States, Eastern Canada, the Northeastern United States, and much of the Eastern Seaboard, and had Heat index/Humidex readings reaching upwards of 131 °F (55 °C). On a national basis, the heat wave was the hottest in 75 years.

== July 2011 ==
Before the start of the heat wave, two derecho events took place; one on July 11 over most of the central Plains, the lower Great Lakes and the Appalachian region; the other on July 17 over eastern Ontario, southern Quebec and northern New England. Such forcing events often occur on the northern periphery of vast areas of continental heat domes that move northward during the summer months. On July 19, 2011, the highest dew point in Minnesota occurred at 88 °F (31 °C). On July 21, 2011, hot weather over the past week culminated into record-breaking temperatures across the province of Ontario, also in Michigan, Ohio, upstate New York and Quebec, shattering long held records. Toronto reached 100 °F (38 °C) with a perceived humidex reading of 124 °F (51 °C)

The intense heat moved eastwards and peaked along the Interstate 95 corridor on July 22, 2011, with Central Park in New York City breaking the record for the day at 104 °F (40 °C) or more in the interior of city which was the hottest temperature the city had experienced in over three decades. Newark, New Jersey also reached an all-time record high of 108 °F (42 °C), as did Washington Dulles International Airport in Virginia at 105 °F (41 °C), while Bridgeport, Connecticut tied their record at 103 °F (39 °C). Philadelphia surpassed its daily record when it reached 103 °F (39 °C), and Boston tied for the second highest temperature on record at 103 °F (39 °C), making it the hottest day in 85 years. The heat was blamed for at least 22 deaths across the Midwest and the Northeast. Daily high temperatures warmer than normal began on the southern plains during May 2011, accompanied by one of the most severe droughts ever recorded.

== August 2011 ==
In Oklahoma, by August 3, several locations in the southwestern portion of the state had recorded 43 consecutive days exceeding 100 °F (38 °C). Air temperatures exclusive of heat index exceeded 110 °F (43 °C) for much of the state on August 2 and 3, reaching 115 °F (46 °C) in Poteau and Wilburton on August 3. On the same day, Little Rock, Arkansas plateaued at 45.9 °C (114.6 °F) in the shade.

As of August 10, Dallas/Fort Worth had recorded 40 consecutive days with high temperatures exceeding 100 °F (38 °C), the second-longest streak on record (the record of 42 days was set during the 1980 United States heat wave). In addition, the area set a new all-time hottest minimum temperature of 86 °F (30 °C) on July 26 and tied it thrice in August. However, by September 13, Dallas had endured 71 non-consecutive days with temperatures exceeding 100 °F (38 °C), beating the record of 69 days set in 1980.

On August 24, a 5-hour long severe thunderstorm hit Southern Ontario that evening which also spawned a pair of weak tornadoes, nothing particularly unusual for August, but it set records for lightning frequency, thought to be fueled by abnormally high Lake Ontario water surface temperatures due to the heat wave.

== Record heat ==
The National Climatic Data Center in Asheville, North Carolina reported that the United States had the hottest summer on record in 2011. Since 1901, only the Dust Bowl era summer of 1936 was hotter. Texas, Oklahoma, New Mexico and Louisiana all reported their hottest summer on record. Delaware had a record warm July in 2011. Based on an index of residential energy demand, 2011 was the hottest summer on record. However, the states of Oregon and Washington recorded cooler than average summers, while California recorded its wettest.

== Water levels ==
The continuing heat and drought resulted in several lakes dropping to record lows, particularly in Texas and Oklahoma. This resulted in re-exposing old towns and other historical sites that were submerged by dam construction. The original site of Bluffton, Texas was re-exposed, revealing a town site that had been submerged under Lake Buchanan since a dam was completed in 1939. The town of Woodville, Oklahoma was also re-exposed as Lake Texoma dropped.

== Arkansas ==
=== Little Rock, Arkansas ===
Little Rock was the second hottest city in Arkansas during the heat wave. Little Rock recorded an all-time record high of 114 °F (46 °C) on August 3, 2011.

=== Fort Smith, Arkansas ===
Fort Smith was the hottest city in Arkansas. it reported an all-time record high of 115 °F (46 °C) on August 3.

== Louisiana ==
=== Shreveport, Louisiana ===
Shreveport recorded its hottest month ever in August 2011, with an average temperature of 91.5 °F (33.1 °C) (average high of 104.4 °F (40.2 °C) and average low of 78.6 °F (25.9 °C).

== Colorado ==
=== Colorado Springs, Colorado ===
In Colorado Springs, temperatures reached 97 °F (36 °C) (near record highs) as early as June. Daytime highs in June, July, and August were about 6°F above average. Temperatures were elevated during the heat wave, but remained cooler than temperatures in the Great Plains to the east.

Climate data for Colorado Springs, Colorado (Year of 2011 only)
Month	Jan	Feb	Mar	Apr	May	Jun	Jul	Aug	Sep	Oct	Nov	Dec	Year
Mean daily maximum °F (°C)	43.1 (6.2)	42.5 (5.8)	57.2 (14.0)	62.4 (16.9)	67.3 (19.6)	88.3 (31.3)	89.3 (31.8)	88.3 (31.3)	75.3 (24.1)	64.8 (18.2)	54.1 (12.3)	41.9 (5.5)	64.4 (18.0)
Mean daily minimum °F (°C)	15.5 (−9.2)	16.0 (−8.9)	29.0 (−1.7)	34.1 (1.2)	41.1 (5.1)	54.7 (12.6)	60.9 (16.1)	59.9 (15.5)	49.6 (9.8)	36.6 (2.6)	27.0 (−2.8)	15.9 (−8.9)	36.7 (2.6)
Average precipitation inches (mm)	0.11 (2.8)	0.14 (3.6)	0.54 (14)	0.68 (17)	0.69 (18)	0.26 (6.6)	4.90 (124)	1.49 (38)	5.91 (150)	0.87 (22)	0.19 (4.8)	0.46 (12)	16.24 (412)
Source: Wunderground Weather History

Climate data for Colorado Springs, Colorado (1981-2010 normals)
Month	Jan	Feb	Mar	Apr	May	Jun	Jul	Aug	Sep	Oct	Nov	Dec	Year
Mean daily maximum °F (°C)	43.2 (6.2)	44.8 (7.1)	52.1 (11.2)	59.8 (15.4)	69.1 (20.6)	79.0 (26.1)	84.8 (29.3)	81.6 (27.6)	74.5 (23.6)	63.0 (17.2)	51.0 (10.6)	42.1 (5.6)	62.1 (16.7)
Mean daily minimum °F (°C)	17.7 (−7.9)	19.5 (−6.9)	26.0 (−3.3)	33.3 (0.7)	42.7 (5.9)	51.3 (10.7)	56.9 (13.8)	55.7 (13.2)	47.3 (8.5)	35.8 (2.1)	25.2 (−3.8)	17.5 (−8.1)	35.7 (2.1)
Average precipitation inches (mm)	0.32 (8.1)	0.34 (8.6)	1.00 (25)	1.42 (36)	2.03 (52)	2.50 (64)	2.84 (72)	3.34 (85)	1.19 (30)	0.82 (21)	0.40 (10)	0.34 (8.6)	16.54 (420)
Source: NOAA

=== Pueblo, Colorado ===
Pueblo, Colorado experienced temperatures up to 101 °F (38 °C) as early as June. On August 5, 2011, Pueblo recorded a temperature of 100 °F (38 °C), breaking the record of 98 °F (37 °C) set back in 1954.

=== Denver, Colorado ===
Denver, Colorado saw temperatures as high as 104 °F (40 °C) as early as June 19, 2011. Denver International Airport recorded a high of 102 °F (39 °C) on June 29, 2011. This broke the record of 95 °F (35 °C) set back in 1978. The high of 104 °F (40 °C) was set on July 28, 2011. This temperature broke the previous record of 100 °F (38 °C) set back in 1991.

== Wyoming ==
=== Cheyenne, Wyoming ===
Cheyenne, Wyoming also recorded above average temperatures during the heat wave. On August 5, 2011, Cheyenne was 88 °F (31 °C) compared to the 79 °F (26 °C) average.

== Kansas ==
=== Wichita, Kansas ===
Fully subjected to the heat wave, Wichita had an unusually hot summer in 2011. Wichita reached a temperature of 111 °F (44 °C) twice over the course of the heat wave, once in July, and once in August. Daytime highs in the months of June, July, and August averaged almost 9 °F over prior observed normals. The year was also substantially drier than average.

Climate data for Wichita, Kansas (Year of 2011 only)
Month	Jan	Feb	Mar	Apr	May	Jun	Jul	Aug	Sep	Oct	Nov	Dec	Year
Mean daily maximum °F (°C)	40.9 (4.9)	44.8 (7.1)	59.2 (15.1)	72.4 (22.4)	78.4 (25.8)	94.5 (34.7)	102.5 (39.2)	97.7 (36.5)	82.6 (28.1)	73.9 (23.3)	57.1 (13.9)	46.4 (8.0)	70.9 (21.6)
Mean daily minimum °F (°C)	16.9 (−8.4)	20.5 (−6.4)	36.7 (2.6)	45.2 (7.3)	54.4 (12.4)	68.3 (20.2)	76.2 (24.6)	72.1 (22.3)	56.0 (13.3)	46.6 (8.1)	33.1 (0.6)	27.0 (−2.8)	46.1 (7.8)
Average precipitation inches (mm)	0.34 (8.6)	1.39 (35)	0.97 (25)	1.46 (37)	2.45 (62)	4.73 (120)	1.45 (37)	3.45 (88)	0.98 (25)	1.83 (46)	3.32 (84)	3.69 (94)	26.06 (662)
Source: Wunderground Weather History

Climate data for Wichita, Kansas (1981-2010 normals)
Month	Jan	Feb	Mar	Apr	May	Jun	Jul	Aug	Sep	Oct	Nov	Dec	Year
Mean daily maximum °F (°C)	42.5 (5.8)	48.2 (9.0)	57.9 (14.4)	67.7 (19.8)	76.7 (24.8)	86.7 (30.4)	92.3 (33.5)	91.2 (32.9)	82.5 (28.1)	69.7 (20.9)	56.2 (13.4)	43.5 (6.4)	67.9 (19.9)
Mean daily minimum °F (°C)	21.9 (−5.6)	26.1 (−3.3)	35.0 (1.7)	44.5 (6.9)	55.2 (12.9)	64.9 (18.3)	69.8 (21.0)	68.8 (20.4)	59.5 (15.3)	46.9 (8.3)	34.6 (1.4)	24.1 (−4.4)	45.9 (7.7)
Average precipitation inches (mm)	0.83 (21)	1.18 (30)	2.69 (68)	2.59 (66)	4.57 (116)	5.20 (132)	3.32 (84)	3.71 (94)	3.14 (80)	2.78 (71)	1.43 (36)	1.20 (30)	32.64 (829)
Source: NOAA

== Oklahoma ==
=== Oklahoma City, Oklahoma ===
Oklahoma City, Oklahoma experienced extremely hot temperatures in the summer of 2011, and below normal rainfall. While winter, spring, and fall temperatures were close to normals, Central Oklahoma started to experience abnormally high temperatures after a very wet month of May. High temperatures in the months of June, July, and August were 9 °F above normals, and overnight lows were also significantly above norm. The heat was so extreme, that OGE, the area's main electricity provider, refused to cut off electric service in the month of August, as it felt that this might result in deaths among the elderly, many of whom used electric power to air-condition their homes. The following data is for the weather station at Will Rogers World Airport, located southwest of the city, which during the summer, experienced a peak temperature of 110 °F (43 °C). Due to the urban heat island effect, most of the urban area of Oklahoma City was even hotter than the temperatures recorded at the airport. One weather station, located in an urban part of the city, recorded an air temperature of 116 °F (47 °C) on August 3. The heat wave finally ended on September 15, 2011, when a cold front moved through Central Oklahoma.

Climate data for Oklahoma City, Oklahoma. (YEAR OF 2011 ONLY)
Month	Jan	Feb	Mar	Apr	May	Jun	Jul	Aug	Sep	Oct	Nov	Dec	Year
Record high °F (°C)	76 (24)	80 (27)	88 (31)	93 (34)	94 (34)	104 (40)	110 (43)	110 (43)	102 (39)	88 (31)	80 (27)	71 (22)	110 (43)
Mean daily maximum °F (°C)	50 (10)	54 (12)	66 (19)	79 (26)	81 (27)	97 (36)	102 (39)	102 (39)	86 (30)	75 (24)	61 (16)	52 (11)	75 (24)
Mean daily minimum °F (°C)	23 (−5)	28 (−2)	41 (5)	50 (10)	59 (15)	72 (22)	75 (24)	75 (24)	59 (15)	50 (10)	39 (4)	32 (0)	50 (10)
Record low °F (°C)	9 (−13)	−5 (−21)	25 (−4)	33 (1)	36 (2)	62 (17)	71 (22)	68 (20)	46 (8)	34 (1)	24 (−4)	15 (−9)	−5 (−21)
Average precipitation inches (mm)	0.1 (2.5)	1.7 (43)	0.1 (2.5)	1.0 (25)	9.2 (230)	1.2 (30)	3.0 (76)	2.0 (51)	1.6 (41)	5.6 (140)	2.2 (56)	1.8 (46)	29.5 (750)
Source: Wunderground Weather History

Climate data for Oklahoma City, Oklahoma. (1981-2010 normals)
Month	Jan	Feb	Mar	Apr	May	Jun	Jul	Aug	Sep	Oct	Nov	Dec	Year
Mean daily maximum °F (°C)	50 (10)	55 (13)	63 (17)	72 (22)	80 (27)	88 (31)	94 (34)	93 (34)	85 (29)	73 (23)	61 (16)	50 (10)	72 (22)
Mean daily minimum °F (°C)	29 (−2)	33 (1)	41 (5)	50 (10)	60 (16)	68 (20)	72 (22)	71 (22)	63 (17)	52 (11)	40 (4)	30 (−1)	50 (10)
Average precipitation inches (mm)	1.4 (36)	1.6 (41)	3.1 (79)	3.1 (79)	4.7 (120)	4.9 (120)	2.9 (74)	3.3 (84)	4.1 (100)	3.7 (94)	2.0 (51)	1.9 (48)	36.5 (930)

=== Lawton, Oklahoma ===
Lawton, Oklahoma experienced even hotter weather than Oklahoma City reported. In Lawton, daytime high temperatures during the months of June, July, and August averaged 11 °F above the previously observed normals, and nighttime lows averaged 8 °F above normal. In at least one weather station in Lawton, less than half the normal rainfall was recorded over the course of the year, and almost none was recorded during the summer.

Climate data for Lawton, Oklahoma (Year of 2011 only)
Month	Jan	Feb	Mar	Apr	May	Jun	Jul	Aug	Sep	Oct	Nov	Dec	Year
Mean daily maximum °F (°C)	52.2 (11.2)	57.9 (14.4)	70.7 (21.5)	82.5 (28.1)	86.8 (30.4)	102.6 (39.2)	106.7 (41.5)	107.1 (41.7)	89.8 (32.1)	77.8 (25.4)	64.0 (17.8)	51.4 (10.8)	79.1 (26.2)
Daily mean °F (°C)	36.2 (2.3)	43.0 (6.1)	55.5 (13.1)	65.0 (18.3)	72.4 (22.4)	87.7 (30.9)	92.3 (33.5)	92.2 (33.4)	73.9 (23.3)	63.9 (17.7)	51.0 (10.6)	41.2 (5.1)	64.6 (18.1)
Mean daily minimum °F (°C)	20.2 (−6.6)	28.1 (−2.2)	40.4 (4.7)	49.6 (9.8)	57.9 (14.4)	72.7 (22.6)	77.9 (25.5)	77.3 (25.2)	58.0 (14.4)	50.0 (10.0)	38.0 (3.3)	31.1 (−0.5)	50.1 (10.1)
Average precipitation inches (mm)	0.12 (3.0)	0.09 (2.3)	0.01 (0.25)	0.22 (5.6)	5.66 (144)	0.26 (6.6)	0.07 (1.8)	0.83 (21)	1.05 (27)	3.10 (79)	1.50 (38)	1.37 (35)	14.28 (363)
Source: Wunderground Weather History

Climate data for Lawton, Oklahoma (1981-2010 normals)
Month	Jan	Feb	Mar	Apr	May	Jun	Jul	Aug	Sep	Oct	Nov	Dec	Year
Mean daily maximum °F (°C)	54.1 (12.3)	58.0 (14.4)	66.8 (19.3)	75.3 (24.1)	83.3 (28.5)	91.4 (33.0)	97.3 (36.3)	97.1 (36.2)	87.8 (31.0)	76.5 (24.7)	64.1 (17.8)	53.6 (12.0)	75.4 (24.1)
Daily mean °F (°C)	40.8 (4.9)	45.1 (7.3)	53.8 (12.1)	62.1 (16.7)	71.3 (21.8)	79.5 (26.4)	84.2 (29.0)	84.0 (28.9)	75.1 (23.9)	63.7 (17.6)	51.0 (10.6)	40.9 (4.9)	62.6 (17.0)
Mean daily minimum °F (°C)	27.5 (−2.5)	32.3 (0.2)	40.8 (4.9)	48.9 (9.4)	59.2 (15.1)	67.7 (19.8)	71.2 (21.8)	70.9 (21.6)	62.3 (16.8)	50.9 (10.5)	37.8 (3.2)	28.1 (−2.2)	49.8 (9.9)
Average precipitation inches (mm)	1.15 (29)	1.34 (34)	2.33 (59)	2.79 (71)	4.19 (106)	3.95 (100)	2.20 (56)	2.73 (69)	3.31 (84)	3.66 (93)	1.79 (45)	1.74 (44)	31.18 (792)
Source: NOAA

=== Tulsa, Oklahoma ===
Tulsa, Oklahoma was also affected by the heat wave with temperatures maxing out 113 °F (45 °C) on August 5, 2011. High temperatures of 111 °F (44 °C) were recorded in Tulsa the following day. On August 8, 2011, high temperatures reached 110 °F (43 °C), almost breaking the record high temperature of 111 °F (44 °C) set back in 1935. Up until October, temperatures in the city remained in the high 80s to the low 100s.

== Texas ==
=== Dallas, Texas ===
Dallas, Texas was affected by the heat wave. In Dallas, temperatures in the months of June, July, and August averaged 8 °F above normals. Dallas also received a below normal amount of precipitation during the year, and no measurable rainfall in July.

Climate data for Dallas, Texas. (YEAR OF 2011 ONLY)
Month	Jan	Feb	Mar	Apr	May	Jun	Jul	Aug	Sep	Oct	Nov	Dec	Year
Mean daily maximum °F (°C)	54 (12)	61 (16)	72 (22)	82 (28)	84 (29)	99 (37)	102 (39)	106 (41)	93 (34)	81 (27)	68 (20)	55 (13)	80 (27)
Mean daily minimum °F (°C)	34 (1)	39 (4)	52 (11)	61 (16)	64 (18)	79 (26)	82 (28)	84 (29)	70 (21)	59 (15)	48 (9)	41 (5)	59 (15)
Average precipitation inches (mm)	1.6 (41)	1.1 (28)	0.5 (13)	3.3 (84)	6.0 (150)	3.6 (91)	0.0 (0.0)	1.0 (25)	1.3 (33)	2.4 (61)	1.8 (46)	4.4 (110)	27 (690)
Source: Wunderground Weather History

Climate data for Dallas, Texas. (Normals)
Month	Jan	Feb	Mar	Apr	May	Jun	Jul	Aug	Sep	Oct	Nov	Dec	Year
Mean daily maximum °F (°C)	55 (13)	61 (16)	69 (21)	77 (25)	84 (29)	92 (33)	96 (36)	96 (36)	89 (32)	79 (26)	66 (19)	57 (14)	77 (25)
Mean daily minimum °F (°C)	36 (2)	41 (5)	49 (9)	56 (13)	65 (18)	73 (23)	77 (25)	76 (24)	69 (21)	58 (14)	47 (8)	39 (4)	57 (14)
Average precipitation inches (mm)	1.9 (48)	2.3 (58)	3.1 (79)	3.5 (89)	5.3 (130)	3.9 (99)	2.4 (61)	2.2 (56)	2.7 (69)	4.7 (120)	2.6 (66)	2.5 (64)	37.1 (940)

=== Amarillo, Texas ===
The Amarillo, Texas area, along with the rest of Texas and the Southern Plains, experienced the worst of the heat wave. Summertime temperatures soared at high as 111 °F (44 °C) in June, and the overall precipitation was only a third of the average. For the months of June, July, and August, average highs were 10 °F above normal, and overnight low temperatures were 6 °F above normal.

Climate data for Amarillo, Texas. (YEAR OF 2011 ONLY)
Month	Jan	Feb	Mar	Apr	May	Jun	Jul	Aug	Sep	Oct	Nov	Dec	Year
Record high °F (°C)	72 (22)	81 (27)	89 (32)	94 (34)	104 (40)	111 (44)	105 (41)	105 (41)	97 (36)	90 (32)	81 (27)	73 (23)	111 (44)
Mean daily maximum °F (°C)	51 (11)	52 (11)	67 (19)	78 (26)	84 (29)	99 (37)	100 (38)	100 (38)	85 (29)	74 (23)	62 (17)	44 (7)	75 (24)
Mean daily minimum °F (°C)	20 (−7)	20 (−7)	35 (2)	43 (6)	49 (9)	66 (19)	71 (22)	70 (21)	56 (13)	45 (7)	34 (1)	25 (−4)	45 (7)
Record low °F (°C)	2 (−17)	−6 (−21)	26 (−3)	32 (0)	33 (1)	55 (13)	63 (17)	66 (19)	48 (9)	28 (−2)	19 (−7)	4 (−16)	−6 (−21)
Average precipitation inches (mm)	0.06 (1.5)	0.43 (11)	0.06 (1.5)	0.05 (1.3)	0.08 (2.0)	0.49 (12)	1.00 (25)	0.53 (13)	0.94 (24)	1.23 (31)	0.62 (16)	1.54 (39)	7.03 (179)
Source: Wunderground Weather History

Climate data for Amarillo, Texas (Normals)
Month	Jan	Feb	Mar	Apr	May	Jun	Jul	Aug	Sep	Oct	Nov	Dec	Year
Mean daily maximum °F (°C)	50.6 (10.3)	54.2 (12.3)	62.5 (16.9)	71.1 (21.7)	79.5 (26.4)	87.7 (30.9)	91.4 (33.0)	89.4 (31.9)	82.6 (28.1)	71.9 (22.2)	60.0 (15.6)	49.7 (9.8)	71.0 (21.7)
Mean daily minimum °F (°C)	23.4 (−4.8)	26.4 (−3.1)	33.3 (0.7)	41.6 (5.3)	51.8 (11.0)	61.0 (16.1)	65.2 (18.4)	64.2 (17.9)	56.4 (13.6)	44.7 (7.1)	32.5 (0.3)	24.0 (−4.4)	43.8 (6.6)
Average precipitation inches (mm)	.72 (18)	.56 (14)	1.39 (35)	1.40 (36)	2.29 (58)	3.16 (80)	2.84 (72)	2.91 (74)	1.92 (49)	1.66 (42)	.80 (20)	.71 (18)	20.36 (517)
Source 1: NOAA (extremes 1892–present), The Weather Channel
Source 2: HKO (sun only, 1961–1990)

== See also ==
- 2010–2013 Southern United States and Mexico drought
