= Smithwick, Texas =

- Unincorporated community
- Location within Texas Location within the United States
- Coordinates: 30°33′39″N 98°08′42″W
- Country: United States
- State: Texas
- County: Burnet
- Elevation: 850 ft (260 m)
- Time zone: UTC-6 (Central (CST))
  - Summer (DST): UTC-5 (CDT)
- Area code: 830
- GNIS feature ID: 1380563

Smithwick is an unincorporated community in Burnet County, Texas, United States. It had a population of 52 in 2000.

== History ==
Smithwick was formed from three smaller communities: Hickory Creek, Elm Grove, and Smithwick Mills, named after Noah Smithwick's mill on the Colorado River. Hickory Creek was established in the 1850s and had a church. A post office was established here in 1871 and remained in operation until 1926, after which mail was sent to the community via Marble Falls. Thomas A. Stinnett served as the postmaster. Its name changed to Smithwick in 1882. Its peak of prosperity was in the mid-1880s, when it had a water-powered gristmill, a church, and 150 inhabitants. Farmers in the area shipped cotton. When the Austin and Northwestern Railroad completed a track to Marble Falls in 1889, the community declined drastically. The population was 50 in 1890, which declined by half within two years. This figure then rose to 30 during the 1930s and 1940s. A church and several scattered houses marked Smithwick on county maps. It had a church, a cemetery, and a community center in the 1980s. Its population was 52 in 2000.

== Geography ==
Smithwick is located on Ranch to Market Road 1431, eight miles east of Marble Falls.

== Education ==
The Hickory Creek and Elm Grove communities had schools in the early 1850s. Elm Grove was described as a school community located near Post Oak Creek. The district kept the name Hickory Creek until the mid-1920s. The school continued to operate in the mid-1880s and was listed on county maps. It joined the Marble Falls Independent School District in 1951. The community continues to be served by the Marble Falls ISD today. Elementary kids attend Colt Elementary School.

== Notable person ==
- Dudley Meredith, American football player who played six seasons as a defensive end in the AFL
