= Seward Junction =

Seward Junction, Texas
- Unincorporated community
- Location within Texas Location within the United States
- Coordinates: 30°39′13″N 97°52′32″W
- Country: United States
- State: Texas
- County: Williamson
- Elevation: 1,010 ft (310 m)
- Time zone: UTC-6 (Central (CST))
  - Summer (DST): UTC-5 (CDT)
- Area codes: 512 & 737

Seward Junction is an area in Liberty Hill, Texas near the intersection of US Highway 183 and Highway 29. It is approximately 30 miles northwest of Austin, Texas and approximately 20 miles west of Georgetown, Texas.

It is named after W.H. Seward, who turned 100 years old in 2008.
