= Bluffton, Texas =

Unincorporated community in Texas, US

- Unincorporated community
- Location in Texas Location in the United States
- Coordinates: 30°49′15″N 98°29′29″W
- Country: United States
- State: Texas
- County: Llano
- Elevation: 1,066 ft (325 m)

Population (2020)
  - Total: 180
- Time zone: UTC-6 (Central (CST))
  - Summer (DST): UTC-5 (CDT)
- ZIP codes: 78607
- GNIS feature ID: 1379435

Bluffton is an unincorporated community in Llano County, Texas, United States. According to the Handbook of Texas, the community had an estimated population of 75 in 2000. In the 2020 Census, the population was reported to be 180.

Bluffton is located at the intersection of RM 2241 and Texas State Highway 261 near the western shore of Lake Buchanan, approximately twelve miles northeast of Llano.

Bluffton has a post office, with the ZIP code 78607. Public education in the community of Bluffton is provided by the Burnet Consolidated Independent School District.

== History ==
Bluffton's original town site is today submerged by Lake Buchanan. When the Buchanan Dam was completed in 1939, it flooded the original townsite. Beginning in 1931, the entire town was moved several miles to the west. It forced town residents to abandon ranches and successful pecan trees. In 2011, a severe drought caused lake levels to drop, re-exposing the old town to dry land.
