= Llano County, Texas =

County in Texas, United States

- County
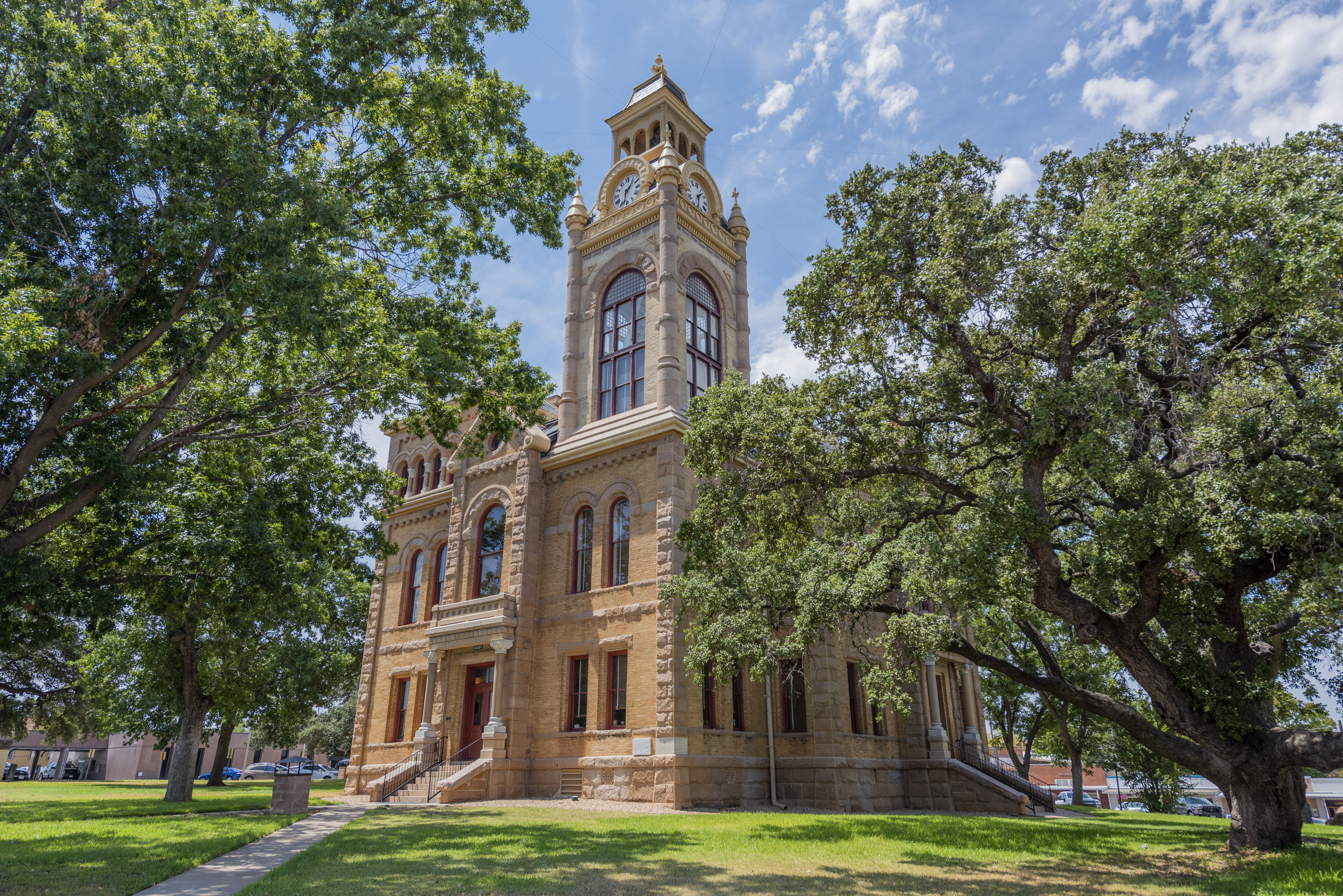
- The Llano County Courthouse in Llano

- Location within the U.S. state of Texas
- Coordinates: 30°43′N 98°41′W
- Country: United States
- State: Texas
- Founded: 1856
- Named for: Llano River
- Seat: Llano
- Largest city: Horseshoe Bay

Area
  - Total: 966 sq mi (2,500 km^{2})
  - Land: 934 sq mi (2,420 km^{2})
  - Water: 32 sq mi (83 km^{2}) 3.3%

Population (2020)
  - Total: 21,243
  - Estimate (2025): 23,353 ▲
  - Density: 22.7/sq mi (8.78/km^{2})
- Time zone: UTC−6 (Central)
  - Summer (DST): UTC−5 (CDT)
- Congressional district: 11th
- Website: www.llanocounty.gov

Llano County (/ˈlænoʊ/) is a county located on the Edwards Plateau in the U.S. state of Texas. As of the 2020 census, its population was 21,243. Its county seat is Llano, and the county is named for the Llano River.

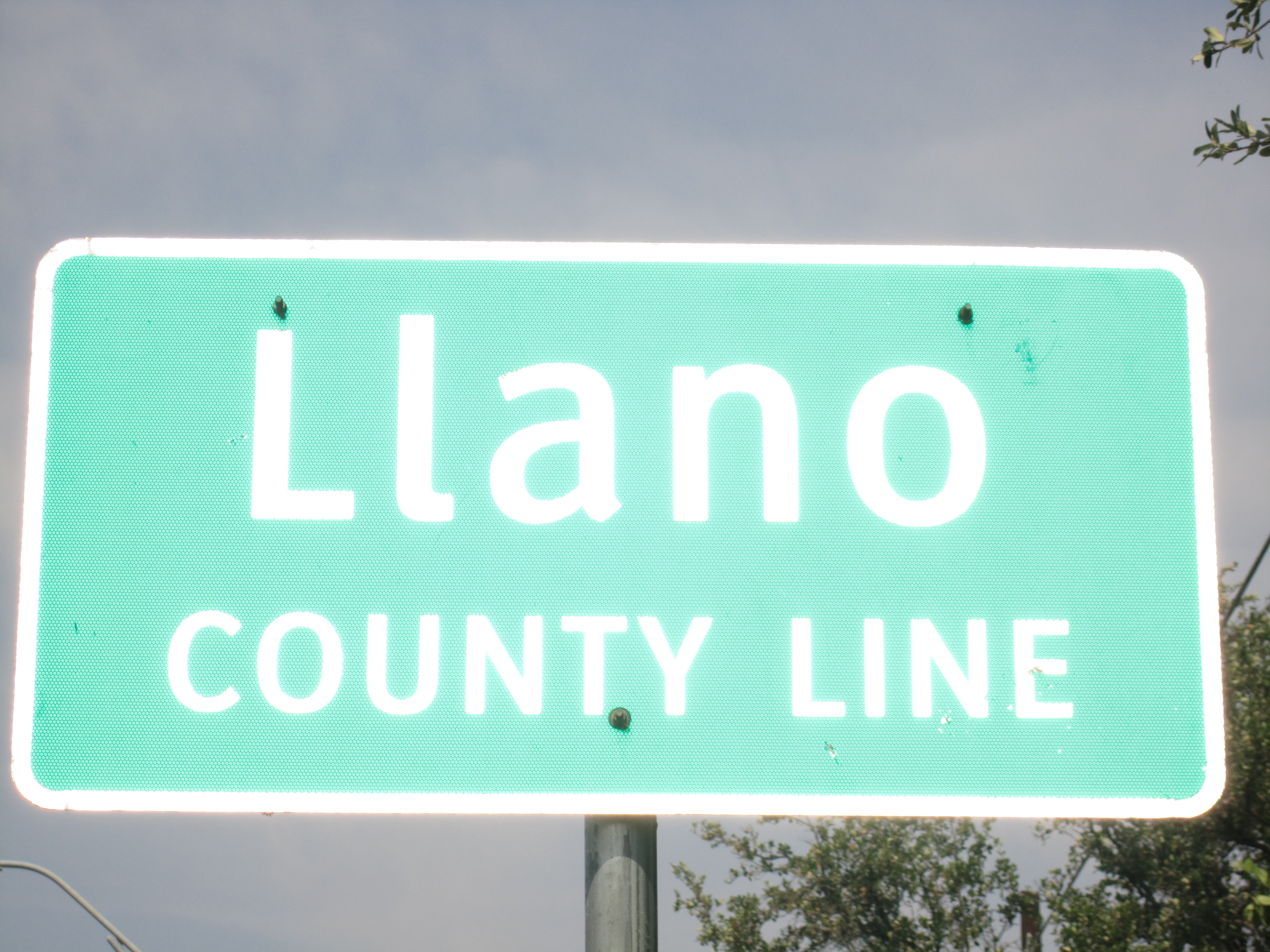

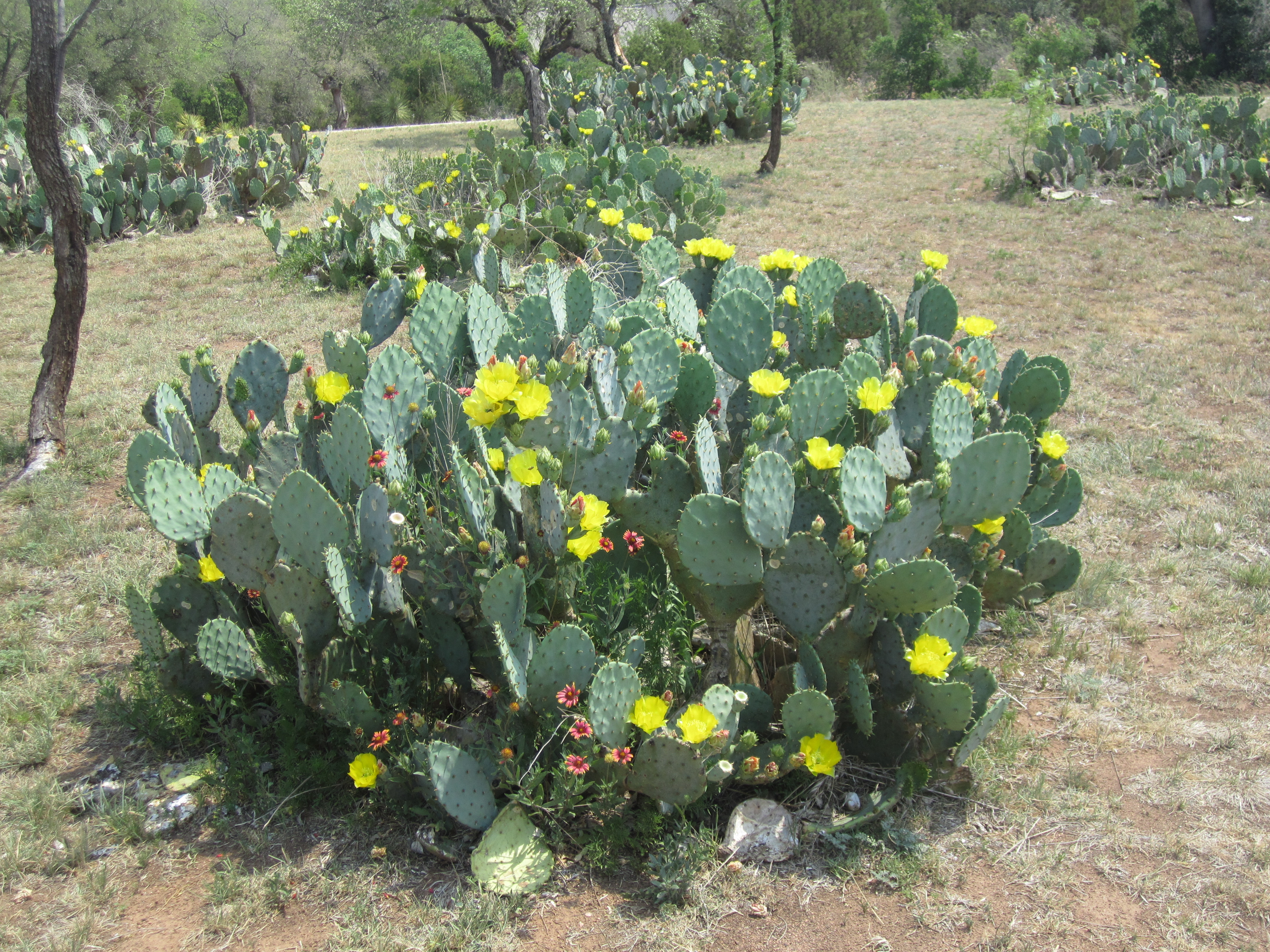
Cactus in spring bloom in rural Llano County

== History ==
The Tonkawa tribe were the first known inhabitants of the region before European settlement.

European settlement began by April 20, 1842, with the founding of the Adelsverein Fisher-Miller Land Grant, setting aside three million acres (12,000 km^{2}) to settle 600 families and single men of German, Dutch, Swiss, Danish, Swedish, and Norwegian ancestry in Texas. By June 26, 1844, Henry Francis Fisher sold his interest in the land grant to the Adelsverein, and by December 20, 1845, both Fisher and Burchard Miller had sold their remaining rights to the organization. In 1847, the Meusebach–Comanche Treaty was signed, and the Bettina commune, named after German liberal Bettina Brentano von Arnim, was founded as the last Adelsverein community in Texas. However, the commune failed within a year due to a lack of governing structure and conflict of authority. By 1860, the population had reached 1,101, including 21 slaveholders and 54 slaves.

During the Civil War, in 1862, one hundred Llano County volunteers join Major John George Walker Division of the Confederate States Army, and in April 1864, a cavalry company under Captain Brazeal was formed to defend against Indian attacks. This unit served under Brigadier General John David McAdoo until it disbanded in June 1865 at war's end. By August 4, 1873, Packsaddle Mountain was the site of the Battle of Packsaddle Mountain, which was both the last Indian raid and battle in the county, marking a turning point that allowed the county's farming economy to expand without the threat of attacks from local Native tribes. Progress continued with the arrival of the Llano branch of the Austin and Northwestern Railroad on June 7, 1892, followed by the completion of the County Courthouse in 1893, designed by Austin architect A. O. Watson. In 1895, the Llano County Jail was erected by the Pauly Jail Building and Manufacturing Company of St Louis, MO.

By the turn of the 20th century, Teich Monument Works was established by Frank Teich, along with the Llano Women's Literary Society was organized a year later in 1901 with sixteen charter members. That same year, the Victorian style Antlers Hotel, a railroad resort located in Kingsland, opened for business.

=== Darmstadt Society of Forty ===
Count Castell of the Adelsverein negotiated with the separate Darmstadt Society of Forty to colonize 200 families on the Fisher–Miller Land Grant in Texas. In return, they were to receive $12,000 in money, livestock, and equipment, and provisions for a year. After the first year, the colonies were expected to support themselves. The colonies attempted were Castell, Leiningen, Bettina, Schoenburg and Meerholz in Llano County; Darmstädler Farm in Comal County; and Tusculum in Kendall County. Of these, only Castell survives. The colonies failed after the Adelsverein funding expired, and also due to conflict of structure and authorities. Some members moved to other Adelsverein settlements in Texas. Others moved elsewhere, or returned to Germany.

=== Library book bans ===
Llano county libraries were purged of books containing sex education and discussion of racism in 2021 and 2022 by county commissioners. Titles removed include In the Night Kitchen, Caste: The Origins of Our Discontents, and Between the World and Me. Librarian Suzette Baker in Kingsland was fired for her refusal to remove books from the shelves. The library board voted unanimously to close its meetings to the public in 2022. After a lawsuit was filed, a federal judge ruled in March 2023 that at least 12 of the books must be placed back onto shelves. In response, county commissioners considered closing the library in a special meeting. They have appealed the decision by the federal judge.

== Geography ==
According to the U.S. Census Bureau, the county has a total area of 966 square miles (2,500 km^{2}), of which 934 square miles (2,420 km^{2}) are land and 32 square miles (83 km^{2}) (3.3%) are covered by water.

Enchanted Rock State Natural Area, a designated state natural area and popular tourist destination, is located in southern Llano county.

Two significant rivers, the Llano and the Colorado, flow through Llano County. These rivers contribute to Lake Buchanan, Inks Lake, and Lake Lyndon B. Johnson, which are all located partially within the county.

=== Major highways ===
- State Highway 16
- State Highway 29
- State Highway 71
- State Highway 261

=== Adjacent counties ===
- San Saba County (north)
- Burnet County (east)
- Blanco County (southeast)
- Gillespie County (south)
- Mason County (west)

== Demographics ==
Historical population
Census	Pop.	Note	%±
1860	1,101		—
1870	1,379		25.2%
1880	4,962		259.8%
1890	6,772		36.5%
1900	7,301		7.8%
1910	6,520		−10.7%
1920	5,360		−17.8%
1930	5,538		3.3%
1940	5,996		8.3%
1950	5,377		−10.3%
1960	5,240		−2.5%
1970	6,979		33.2%
1980	10,144		45.4%
1990	11,631		14.7%
2000	17,044		46.5%
2010	19,301		13.2%
2020	21,243		10.1%
2025 (est.)	23,353	▲	9.9%
U.S. Decennial Census; 1850–2010 2010 2020

=== Racial and ethnic composition ===
Llano County, Texas – Racial and ethnic composition Note: the US Census treats Hispanic/Latino as an ethnic category. This table excludes Latinos from the racial categories and assigns them to a separate category. Hispanics/Latinos may be of any race.
Race / Ethnicity (NH = Non-Hispanic)	Pop 1980	Pop 1990	Pop 2000	Pop 2010	Pop 2020	% 1980	% 1990	% 2000	% 2010	% 2020
White alone (NH)	9,781	11,098	15,869	17,303	17,530	96.42%	95.42%	93.11%	89.65%	82.52%
Black or African American alone (NH)	39	22	51	102	97	0.38%	0.19%	0.30%	0.53%	0.46%
Native American or Alaska Native alone (NH)	38	35	58	87	115	0.37%	0.30%	0.34%	0.45%	0.54%
Asian alone (NH)	16	20	59	76	121	0.16%	0.17%	0.35%	0.39%	0.57%
Native Hawaiian or Pacific Islander alone (NH)	x	x	5	5	4	x	x	0.03%	0.03%	0.02%
Other race alone (NH)	5	3	8	11	61	0.05%	0.03%	0.05%	0.06%	0.29%
Mixed race or Multiracial (NH)	x	x	119	175	807	x	x	0.70%	0.91%	3.80%
Hispanic or Latino (any race)	265	453	875	1,542	2,508	2.61%	3.89%	5.13%	7.99%	11.81%
Total	10,144	11,631	17,044	19,301	21,243	100.00%	100.00%	100.00%	100.00%	100.00%

=== 2020 census ===
As of the 2020 census, the county had a population of 21,243. The median age was 57.7 years. 14.7% of residents were under the age of 18 and 36.3% of residents were 65 years of age or older. For every 100 females there were 96.3 males, and for every 100 females age 18 and over there were 94.0 males age 18 and over.

The racial makeup of the county was 86.6% White, 0.5% Black or African American, 0.8% American Indian and Alaska Native, 0.6% Asian, <0.1% Native Hawaiian and Pacific Islander, 3.6% from some other race, and 7.9% from two or more races. Hispanic or Latino residents of any race comprised 11.8% of the population.

49.8% of residents lived in urban areas, while 50.2% lived in rural areas.

There were 9,794 households in the county, of which 18.0% had children under the age of 18 living in them. Of all households, 52.0% were married-couple households, 18.2% were households with a male householder and no spouse or partner present, and 24.7% were households with a female householder and no spouse or partner present. About 30.8% of all households were made up of individuals and 18.4% had someone living alone who was 65 years of age or older.

There were 15,242 housing units, of which 35.7% were vacant. Among occupied housing units, 77.5% were owner-occupied and 22.5% were renter-occupied. The homeowner vacancy rate was 2.7% and the rental vacancy rate was 14.6%.

=== 2000 census ===
As of the 2000 census, 17,044 people, 7,879 households, and 5,365 families resided in the county. The population density was 18 people per square mile (6.9 people/km^{2}). There were 11,829 housing units at an average density of 13 units per square mile (5.0/km^{2}). The racial makeup of the county was 96.3% White, 0.3% Black or African American, 0.4% Native American, 0.4% Asian, <0.1% Pacific Islander, 1.8% from other races, and 0.8% from two or more races. About 5.1% of the population were Hispanics or Latinos of any race.

Of the 7,879 households, 16.9% had children under the age of 18 living with them, 59.5% were married couples living together, 5.0% had a female householder with no husband present, and 31.9% were not families. About 28.3% of all households were made up of individuals, and 16.0% had someone living alone who was 65 years of age or older. The average household size was 2.13 and the average family size was 2.56.

In the county, the population was distributed as 15.9% under the age of 18, 4.5% from 18 to 24, 18.4% from 25 to 44, 30.5% from 45 to 64, and 30.7% who were 65 years of age or older. The median age was 53 years. For every 100 females, there were 94.4 males. For every 100 females age 18 and over, there were 91.7 males.

The median income for a household in the county was $34,830, and for a family was $40,597. Males had a median income of $30,839 versus $21,126 for females. The per capita income for the county was $23,547. About 7.2% of families and 10.3% of the population were below the poverty line, including 17.2% of those under age 18 and 6.0% of those age 65 or over.

== Communities ==
=== Cities ===
- Horseshoe Bay (partly in Burnet County)
- Llano (county seat)
- Sunrise Beach Village

=== Census-designated places ===
- Buchanan Dam
- Buchanan Lake Village
- Kingsland
- Tow

=== Other unincorporated communities ===
- Bluffton
- Castell
- Valley Spring

=== Ghost towns ===
- Baby Head
- Bettina
- Click
- Oxford

== Notable person ==
- Emil Kriewitz, who lived with the Penateka Comanche, served as guide for Fisher–Miller Land Grant settlers, 1870 Llano County justice of the peace, 1871 Llano County election judge, and was postmaster of Castell from 1876 to 1883. He was buried in Llano County Cemetery.

== Politics ==
Llano County, in common with the Solid South, voted predominantly for Democratic presidential candidates well into the 1960s, with those voters being in the majority even in the 1928, 1952 and 1956 campaigns, with both races from the 1950s featuring native son Dwight D. Eisenhower heading the Republican ticket. This trend reversed itself beginning in 1972 and has become more pronounced, beginning in 2000.

United States presidential election results for Llano County, Texas
Year	Republican		Democratic		Third party(ies)	
Year	No.	%	No.	%	No.	%
1912	29	5.32%	432	79.27%	84	15.41%
1916	72	8.86%	716	88.07%	25	3.08%
1920	184	16.85%	665	60.90%	243	22.25%
1924	88	8.17%	928	86.17%	61	5.66%
1928	439	46.07%	514	53.93%	0	0.00%
1932	108	8.08%	1,229	91.92%	0	0.00%
1936	107	7.59%	1,302	92.41%	0	0.00%
1940	238	13.78%	1,484	85.93%	5	0.29%
1944	198	12.87%	1,199	77.96%	141	9.17%
1948	253	15.06%	1,384	82.38%	43	2.56%
1952	840	43.21%	1,102	56.69%	2	0.10%
1956	672	39.32%	1,034	60.50%	3	0.18%
1960	704	38.26%	1,131	61.47%	5	0.27%
1964	655	27.47%	1,727	72.44%	2	0.08%
1968	1,079	38.19%	1,282	45.38%	464	16.42%
1972	2,164	73.53%	766	26.03%	13	0.44%
1976	1,947	45.03%	2,361	54.60%	16	0.37%
1980	2,866	56.23%	2,130	41.79%	101	1.98%
1984	4,042	67.89%	1,894	31.81%	18	0.30%
1988	3,550	57.24%	2,629	42.39%	23	0.37%
1992	3,056	41.96%	2,409	33.08%	1,818	24.96%
1996	4,290	55.45%	2,633	34.03%	814	10.52%
2000	6,295	72.97%	2,143	24.84%	189	2.19%
2004	7,241	75.72%	2,257	23.60%	65	0.68%
2008	7,281	75.62%	2,250	23.37%	98	1.02%
2012	7,610	79.62%	1,822	19.06%	126	1.32%
2016	8,299	79.44%	1,825	17.47%	323	3.09%
2020	10,079	79.61%	2,465	19.47%	116	0.92%
2024	10,902	79.99%	2,613	19.17%	114	0.84%

United States Senate election results for Llano County, Texas1
Year	Republican		Democratic		Third party(ies)	
Year	No.	%	No.	%	No.	%
2024	10,698	78.53%	2,677	19.65%	248	1.82%

United States Senate election results for Llano County, Texas2
Year	Republican		Democratic		Third party(ies)	
Year	No.	%	No.	%	No.	%
2020	10,047	79.76%	2,331	18.51%	218	1.73%

Texas Gubernatorial election results for Llano County
Year	Republican		Democratic		Third party(ies)	
Year	No.	%	No.	%	No.	%
2022	8,977	81.39%	1,920	17.41%	132	1.20%

== See also ==
- Adelsverein
- Badu Building
- German Texan
- List of museums in Central Texas
- Llano County Courthouse and Jail
- National Register of Historic Places listings in Llano County, Texas
- Recorded Texas Historic Landmarks in Llano County
- Southern Hotel
