= Lake Buchanan (Texas) =

Man-made lake in Texas, United States

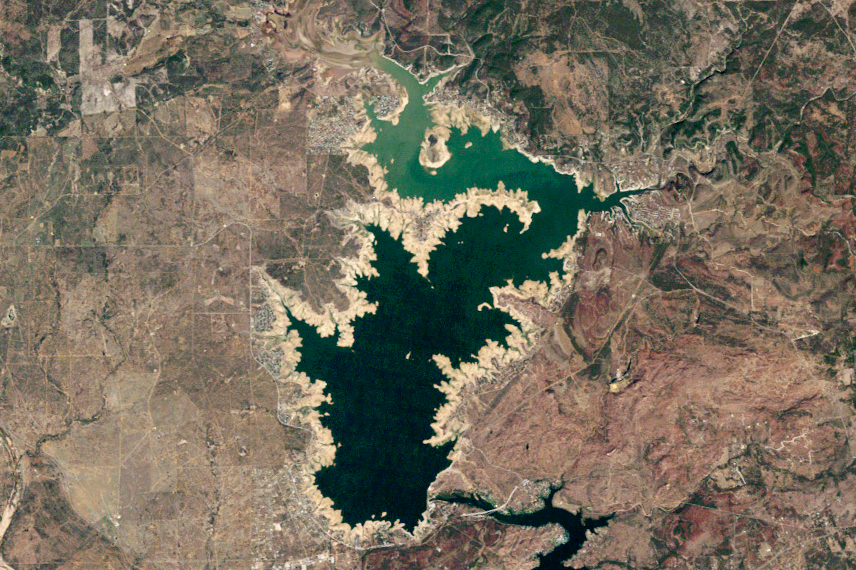
- Landsat 5 image of Lake Buchanan in October 2011

- Location within Texas Location within the United States
- Location: Burnet / Llano counties, Texas, USA
- Coordinates: 30°45.11′N 98°25.12′W
- Type: Hydroelectric reservoir
- Primary inflows: Colorado River
- Primary outflows: Colorado River
- Managing agency: Lower Colorado River Authority
- First flooded: 1939
- Surface area: 22,333 acres (34.9 sq mi; 90.4 km^{2})
- Max. depth: 132 ft (40 m)
- Water volume: 875,566 acre⋅ft (1.079995 km^{3})
- Surface elevation: 1,020 ft (310 m)

Lake Buchanan (/bəˈkænən/) was formed by the construction of Buchanan Dam by the Lower Colorado River Authority to provide a water supply for the region and to provide hydroelectric power. Buchanan Dam, a structure over 2 mi (3.2 km) in length, was completed in 1939. Lake Buchanan was the first of the Texas Highland Lakes to be formed, and with 22,333 acres (34.9 sq mi; 90.4 km^{2}) of surface water, it is also the largest. The surface of the lake includes area in both Burnet and Llano Counties. The lake is west of the city of Burnet, Texas.

The other reservoirs on the Colorado River are Inks Lake, Lake LBJ, Lake Marble Falls, Lake Travis, Lake Austin, and Lady Bird Lake.

The lake is named for Representative James P. Buchanan (1867–1937), who is credited with securing the funding to build the lake and dam.

== History ==
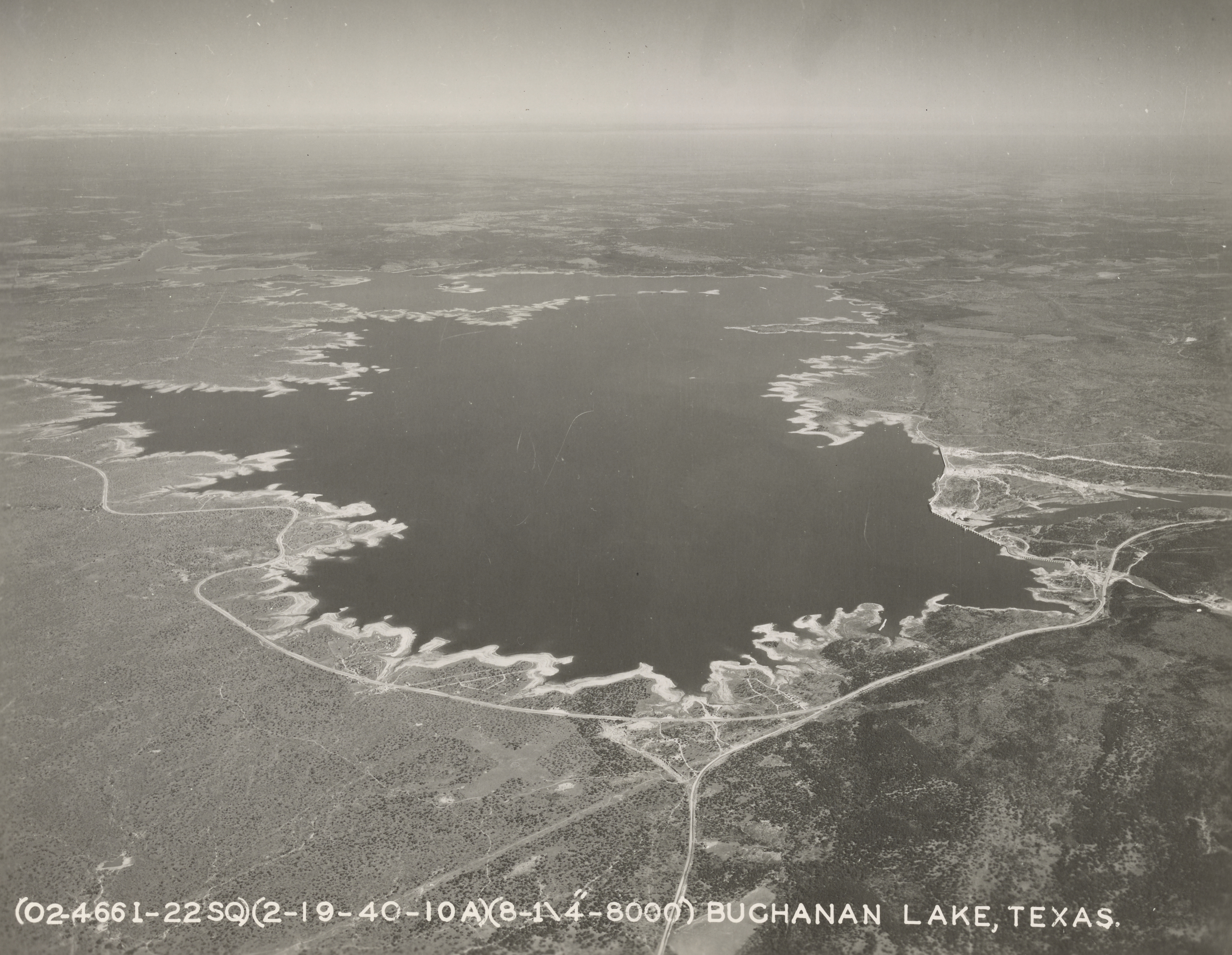
Lake Buchanan in 1940

Lake Buchanan was artificially created upon the completion of the adjacent Buchanan Dam in 1938. Work on the dam itself began in April 1931, but was suspended a year later. Work resumed in 1935, with the dam completed three years later. However, deliberate impounding of the reservoir began in May 1937. Initially, the dam and resulting reservoir project was known as Hamilton Dam and Reservoir, but its name was changed to honor Texas Congressman James P. Buchanan upon the completion of the project; Buchanan had been responsible for securing federal funding for the project. The flooding of the lake forced the community of Bluffton to relocate 5 mi (8.0 km) westward. The abandoned community was soon inundated; however, a drought in 2011 caused Lake Buchanan's water level to drop significantly, exposing the remains of the town.

== Fish and wildlife populations ==
Lake Buchanan has been stocked with several species of fish intended to improve the utility of the reservoir for recreational fishing. Fish present in Lake Buchanan include largemouth bass, catfish, white bass, and striped bass. Lake Buchanan is a level-controlled reservoir, and will not be allowed to flood during periods of heavy rain. The lake level can, however, drop significantly during periods of drought.

== Recreational uses ==
Much of the property bordering Lake Buchanan is privately owned. Many lakeside cottages and homes are rented out on a regular basis. The Lower Colorado River Authority maintains three parks on the lake: Cedar Point Recreation Area, Black Rock Park, and Canyon of the Eagles. County parks and private marinas offer boating access to the lake. Fall Creek Winery, the oldest winery in the Texas Hill Country, is located near the confluence of Fall Creek and Lake Buchanan.
