= Great Plains =

Flat expanse in western North America

- Plain
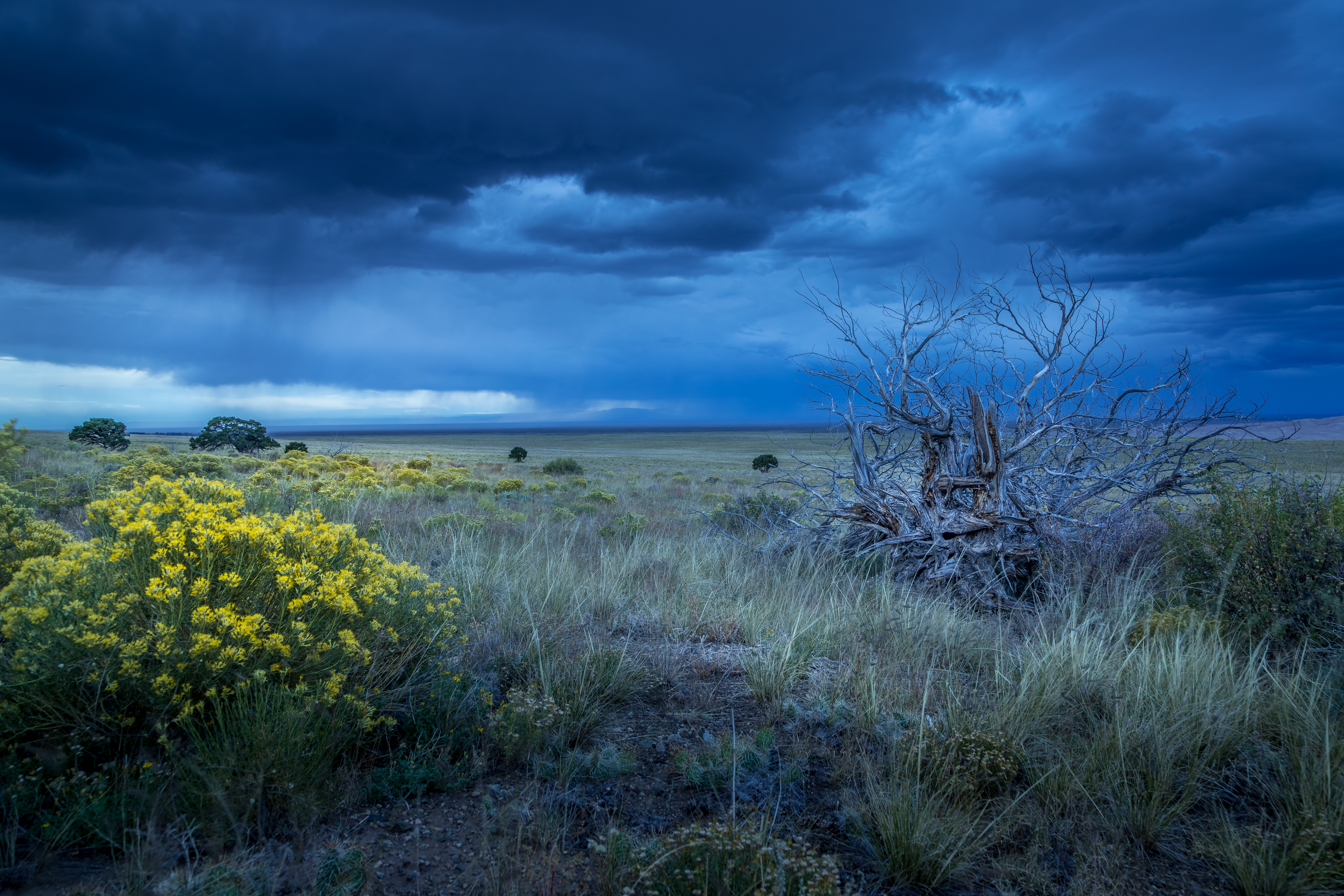
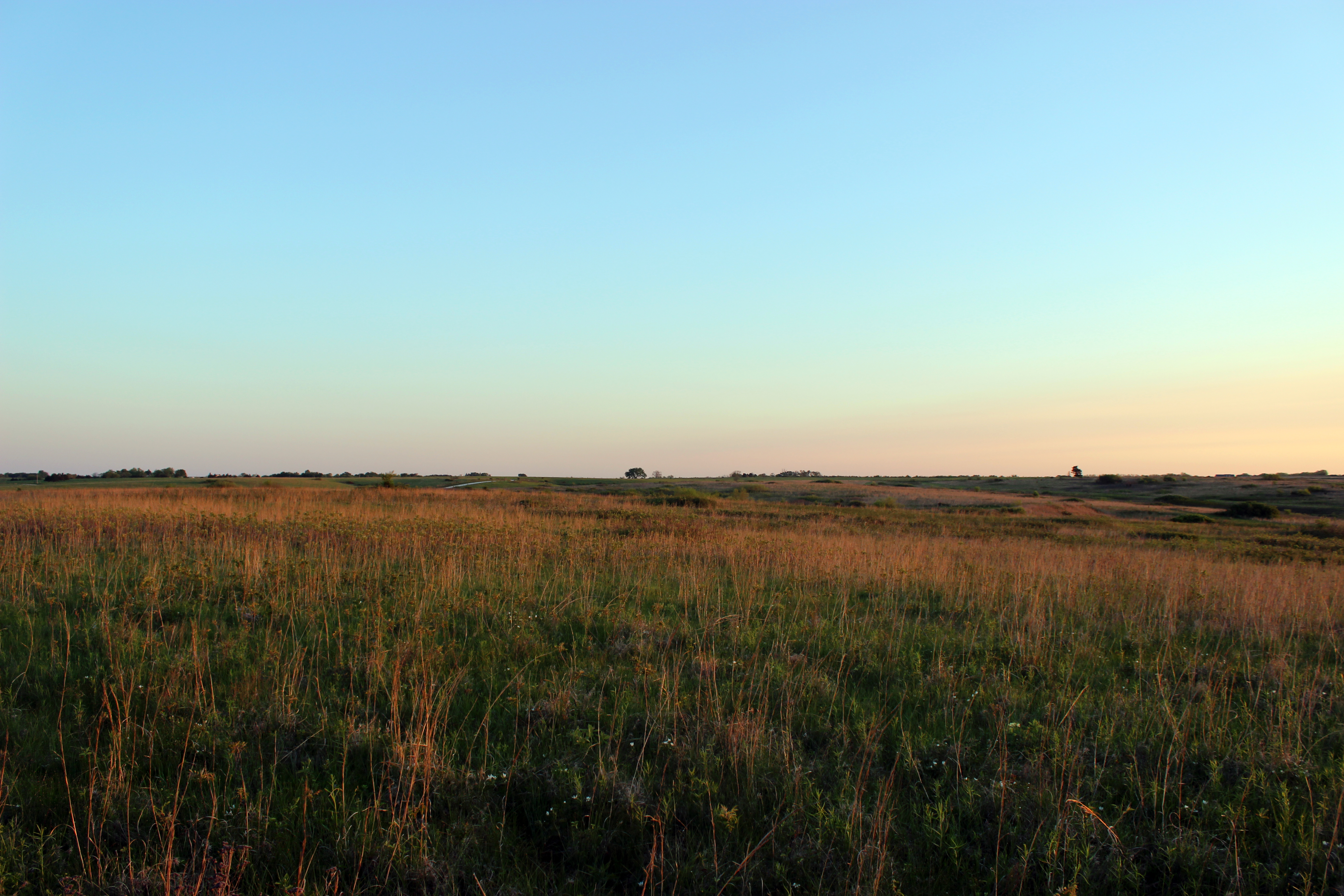
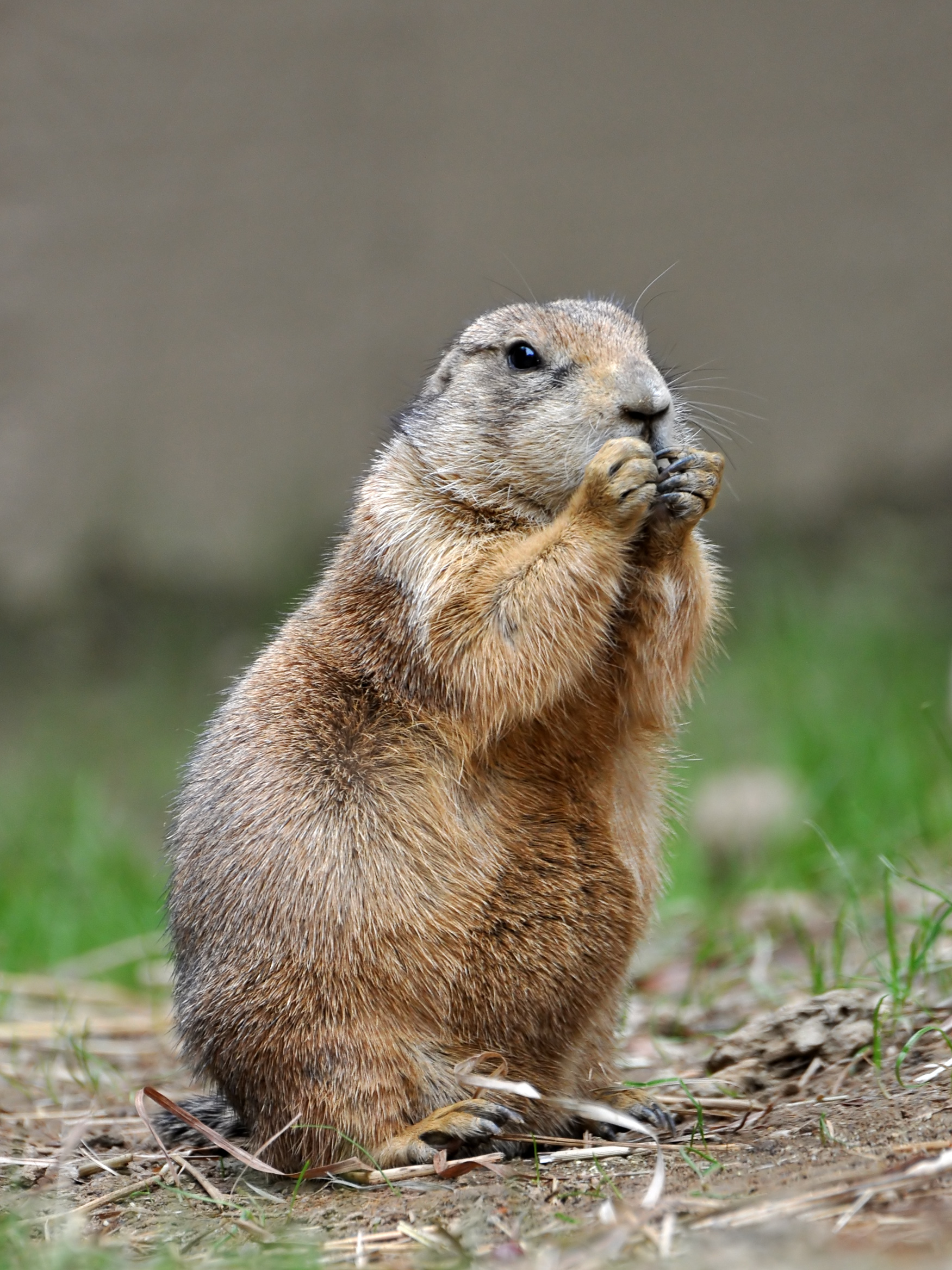
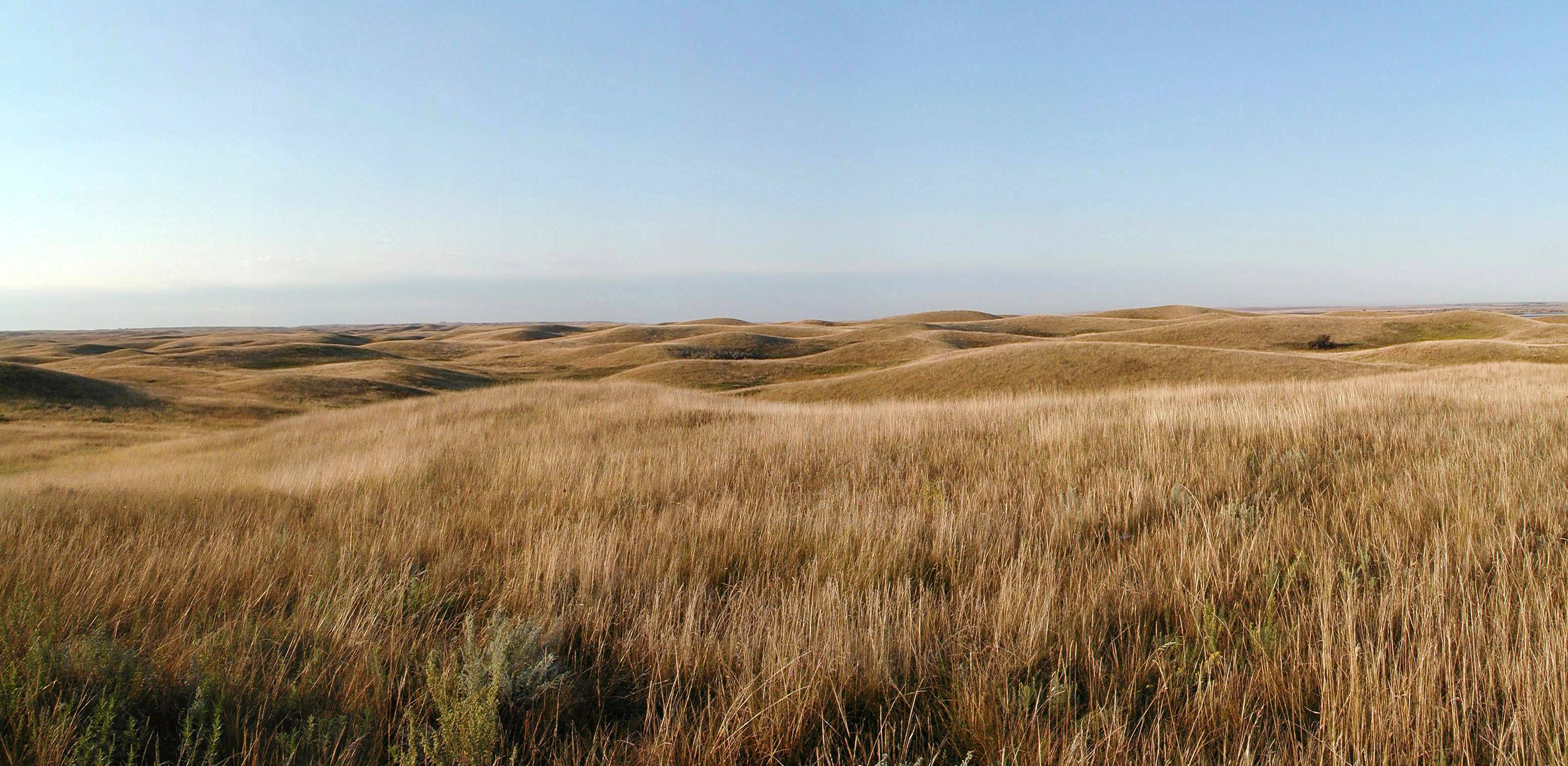
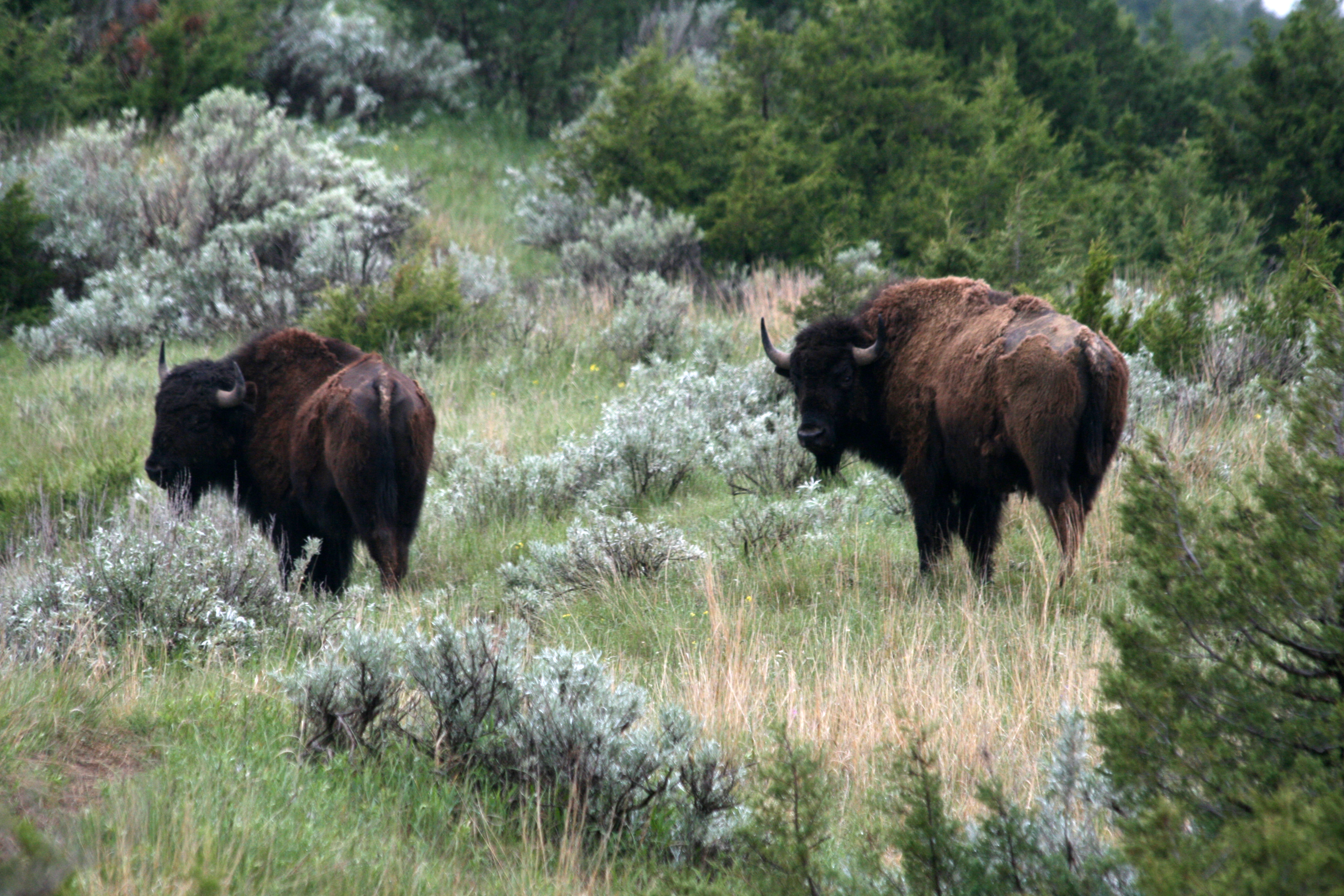
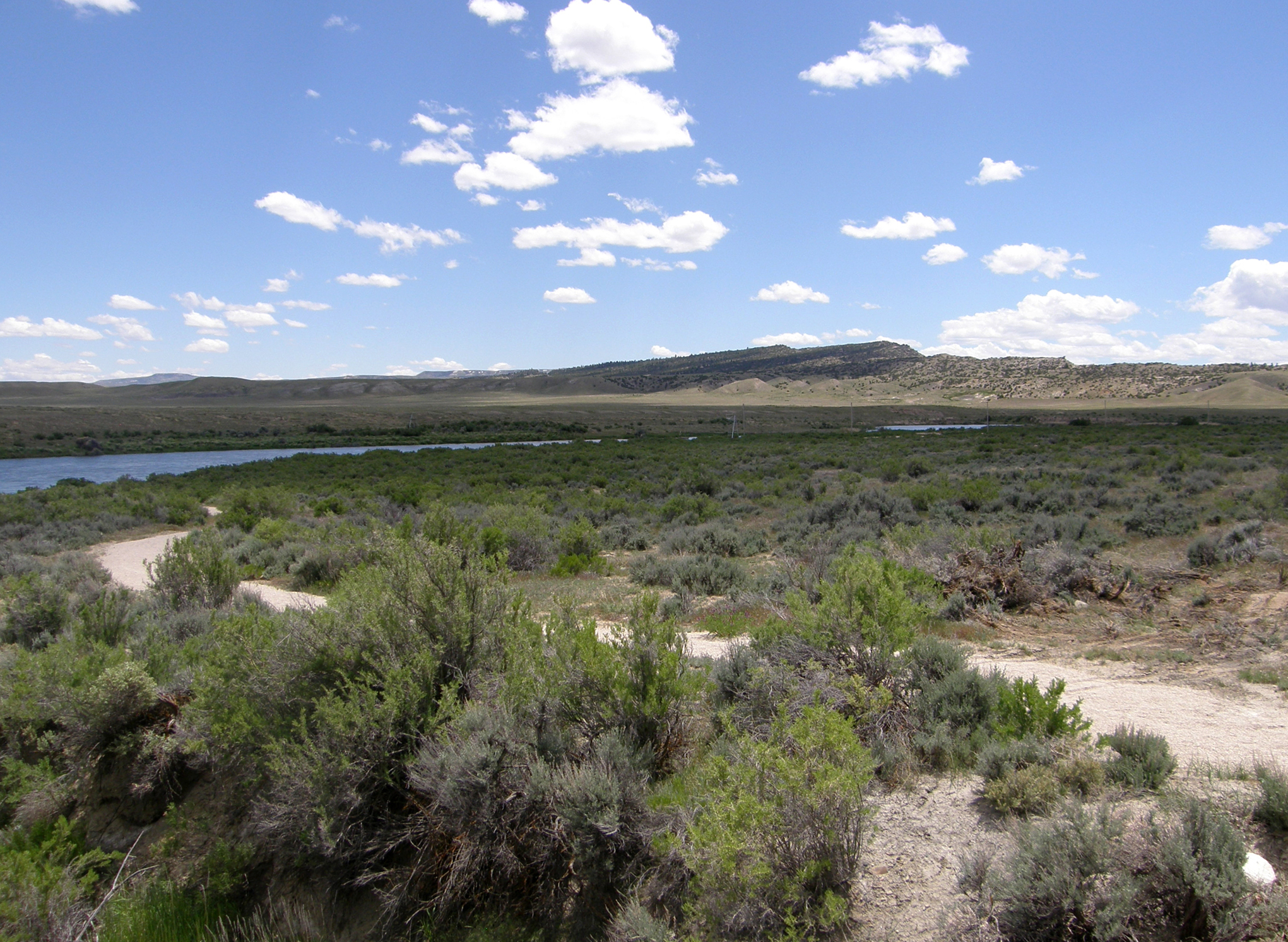
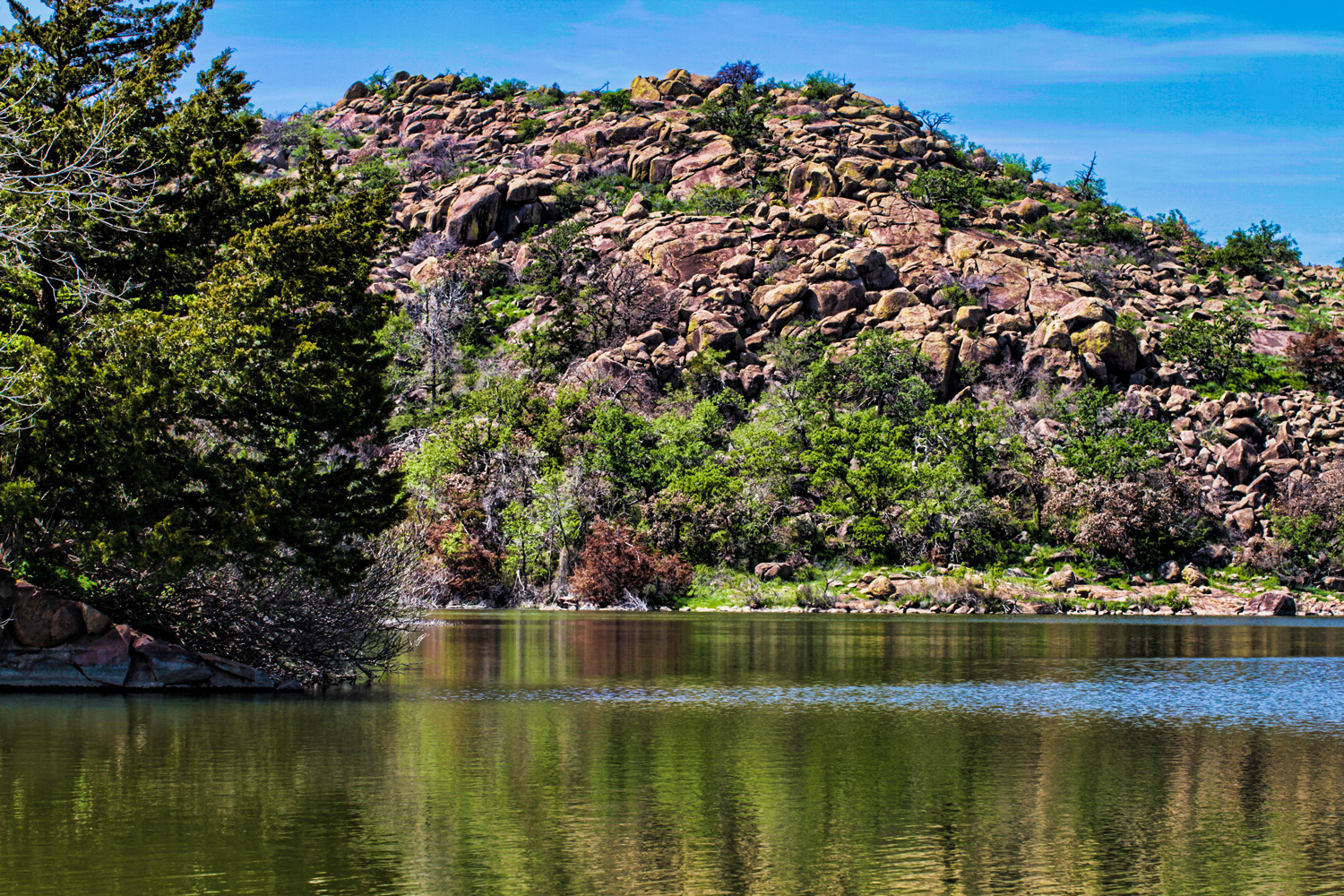
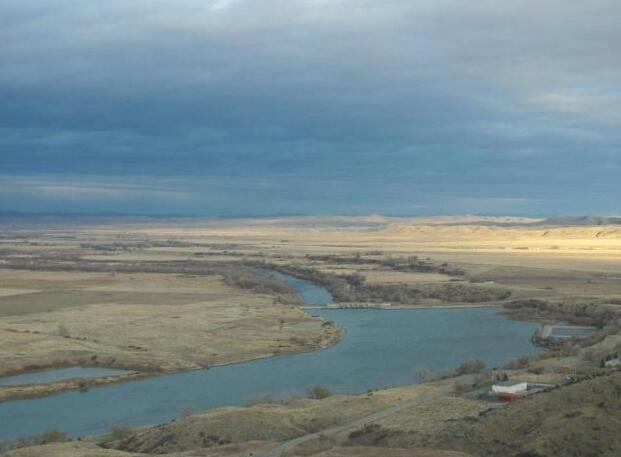
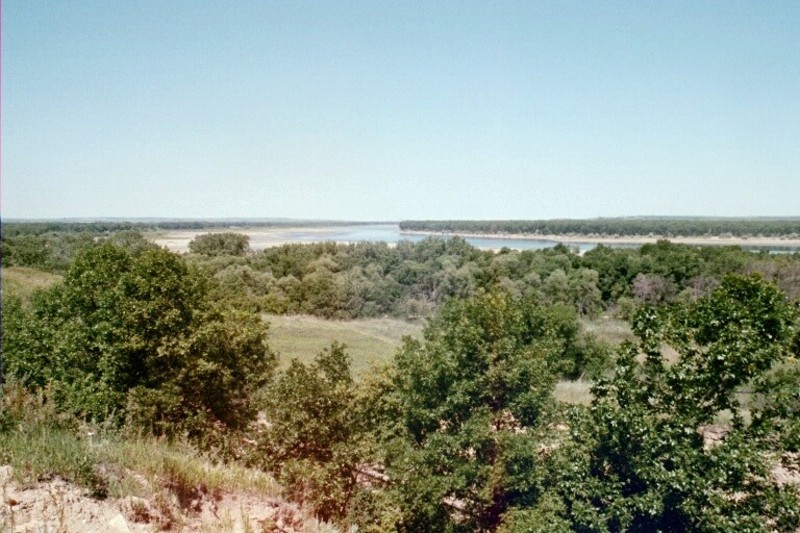
- Blooming rabbitbrush on the Great Plains Cole Camp, Missouri is known for tall expansive flower prairies Prairie dog native to Great Plains, crucial keystone species North Dakota primitive lush prairie Bison, Theodore Roosevelt National Park Redds Great Plains River habitat Great Plains State Park, Oklahoma Mixed plains grass prairie near Fort Smith, Montana Missouri River valley in central North Dakota

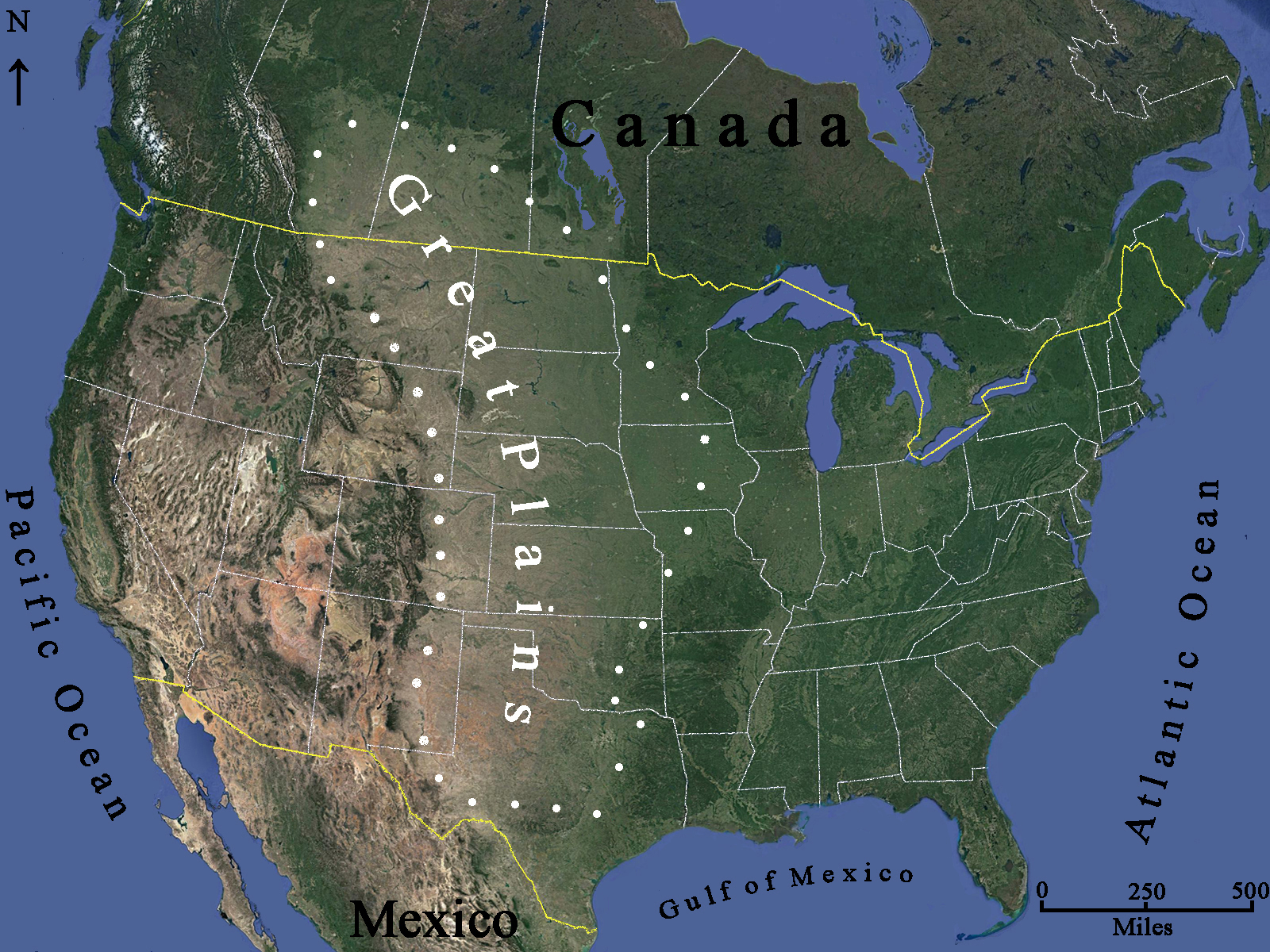
- A satellite image illustrating the generalized distribution of the Great Plains. The exact boundaries may vary among contexts or disciplines (e.g. ecology, geology, geopolitical definitions).
- Location: Canada and the United States

Area
  - Total: 1,100,000 sq mi (2,800,000 km^{2})

Dimensions
  - Length: 2,000 mi (3,200 km)
  - Width: 500 mi (800 km)

The Great Plains (French: Grandes Plaines) is a broad expanse of flatland in North America. The region stretches east of the Rocky Mountains, much of it covered in prairie, steppe, and grassland. They are the western part of the Interior Plains, which include the mixed grass prairie, the Tallgrass prairie between the Great Lakes and Appalachian Plateau, and the Taiga Plains and Boreal Plains ecozones in Northern Canada. "Great Plains", or Western Plains, is also the ecoregion of the Great Plains or the western portion of the Great Plains, some of which in the farthest west is known as the High Plains.

The Great Plains lie across both the Central United States and Western Canada, encompassing:

- Most or all of the U.S. states of Kansas, Nebraska, and North and South Dakota;
- Eastern parts of the U.S. states of Colorado, Montana, and Wyoming;
- Parts of the U.S. states of New Mexico, Oklahoma, Texas;
- Sometimes western parts of Iowa, Minnesota, and Missouri;
- The southern portions of the Canadian provinces of Alberta, Saskatchewan and Manitoba.

== Usage ==
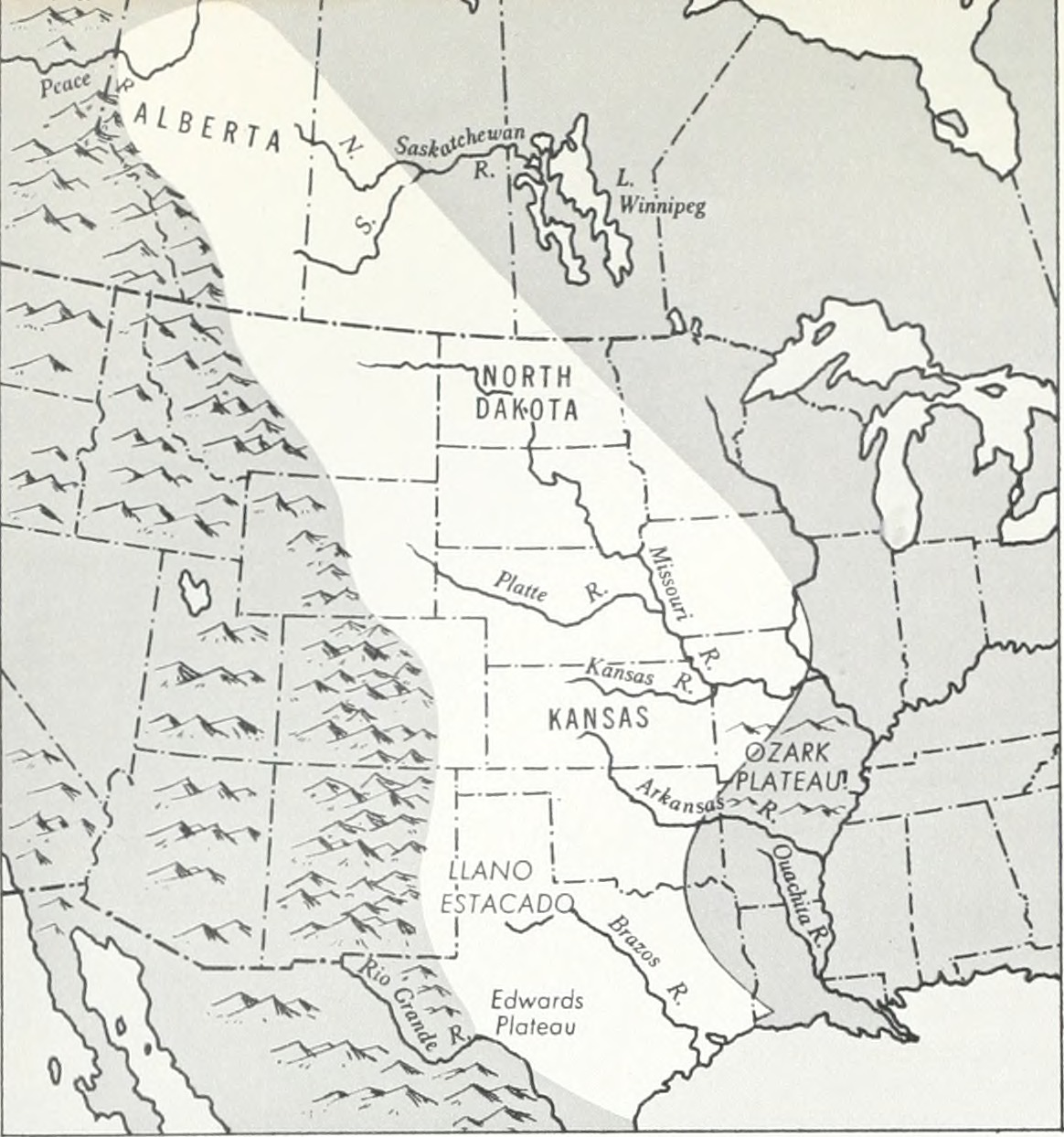
The Great Plains (United States) and the Canadian Prairies

The term "Great Plains" is used in the United States to describe a sub-section of the even more vast Interior Plains physiographic division, which covers much of the interior of North America. It also has currency as a region of human geography, referring to the Plains Indians or the Plains states.

In Canada the term is rarely used; Natural Resources Canada, the government department responsible for official mapping, treats the Interior Plains as one unit consisting of several related plateaus and plains. There is no region referred to as the "Great Plains" in the Atlas of Canada. In terms of human geography, the term "prairie" is more commonly used in Canada, and the region is known as the Canadian Prairies, prairie provinces or simply "the prairies".

The North American Environmental Atlas, produced by the Commission for Environmental Cooperation, a North American Free Trade Agreement (NAFTA) agency composed of the geographical agencies of the Mexican, American, and Canadian governments, uses the "Great Plains" as an ecoregion synonymous with predominant prairies and grasslands rather than as physiographic region defined by topography. The Great Plains ecoregion includes five sub-regions: Temperate Prairies, West-Central Semi-Arid Prairies, South-Central Semi-Arid Prairies, Texas Louisiana Coastal Plains, and Tamaulipas-Texas Semi-Arid Plain, which overlap or expand upon other Great Plains designations.

== Extent ==
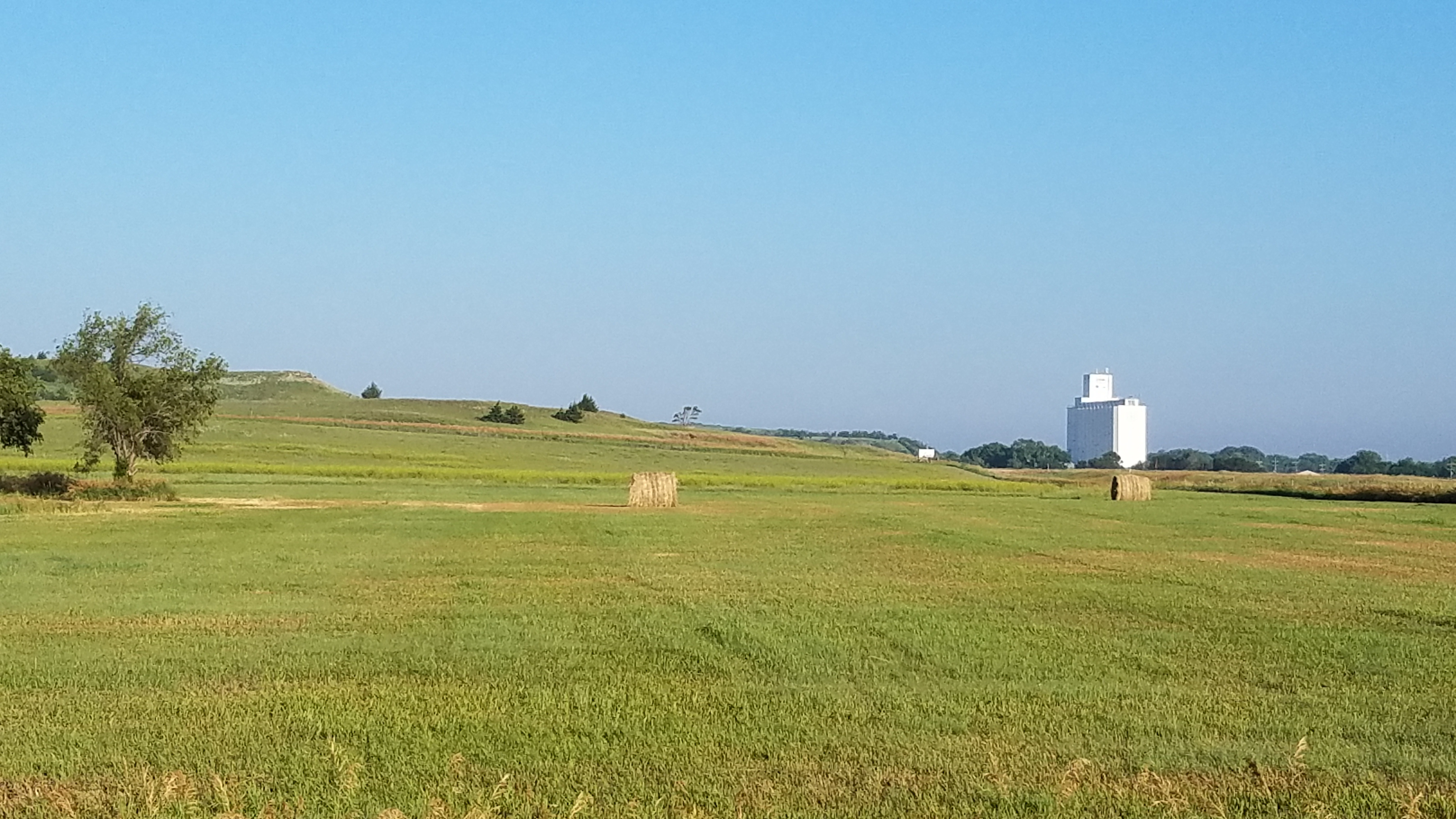
The Great Plains near a farming community in central Kansas

The region is about 500 mi (800 km) east to west and 2,000 mi (3,200 km) north to south. Much of the region was home to American bison herds until they were hunted to near extinction during the mid/late-19th century. It has an area of approximately 500,000 sq mi (1,300,000 km^{2}). Current thinking regarding the geographic boundaries of the Great Plains is shown by this map at the Center for Great Plains Studies, University of Nebraska–Lincoln. This definition, however, is primarily ecological, not physiographic. The Boreal Plains of Western Canada are physiographically the same, but differentiated by their tundra and forest (rather than grassland) appearance.

The term "Great Plains", for the region west of about the 96th meridian west and east of the Rocky Mountains, was not generally used before the early 20th century. Nevin Fenneman's 1916 study Physiographic Subdivision of the United States brought the term Great Plains into more widespread usage. Before that the region was almost invariably called the High Plains, in contrast to the lower elevation Prairie Plains of the Midwestern states. Today the term "High Plains" is used for a subregion of the Great Plains. The term still remains little-used in Canada compared to the more common "prairie".

== Geography ==
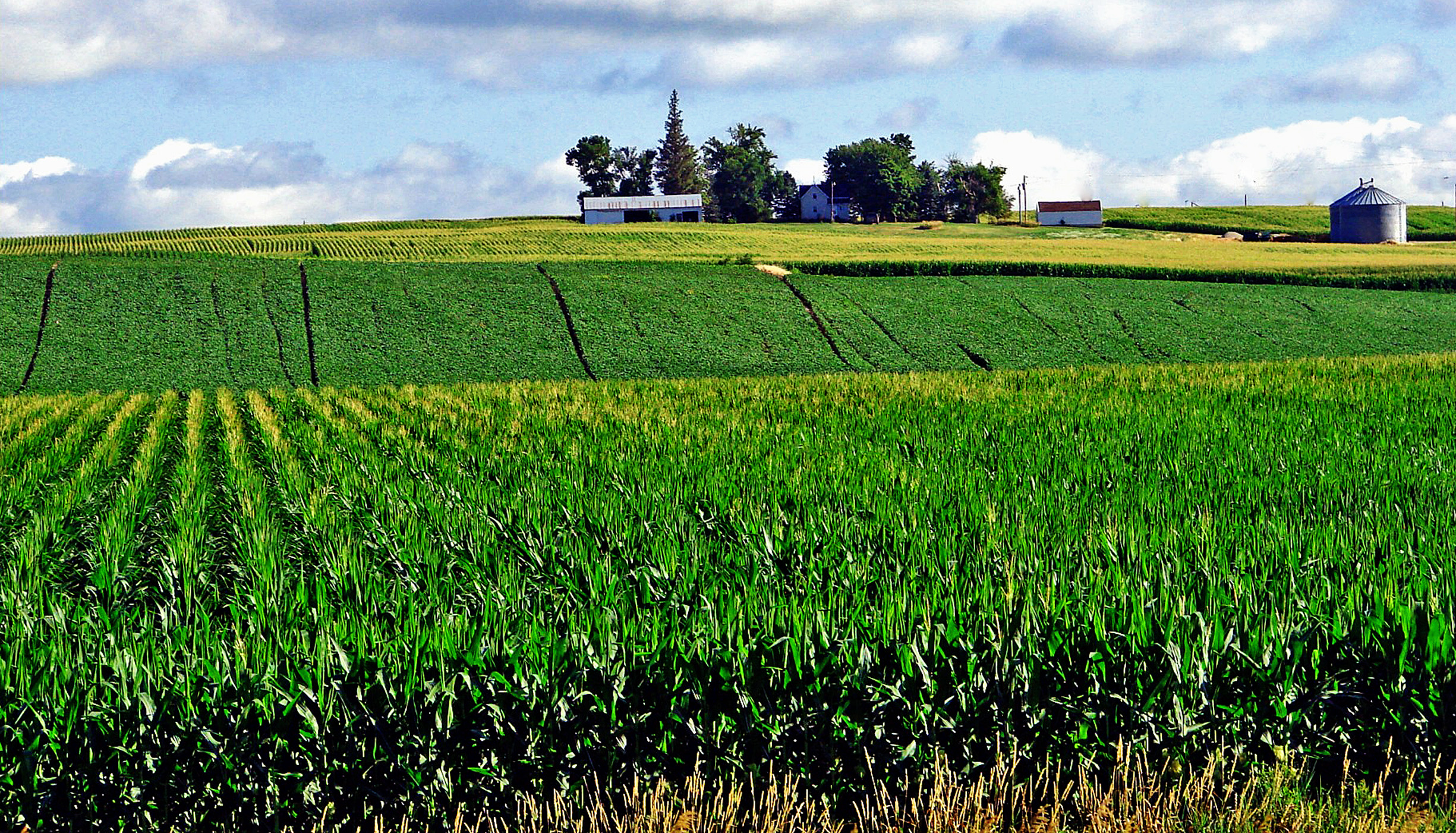
Farmland in Sioux and Lyon Counties, Iowa (2013)

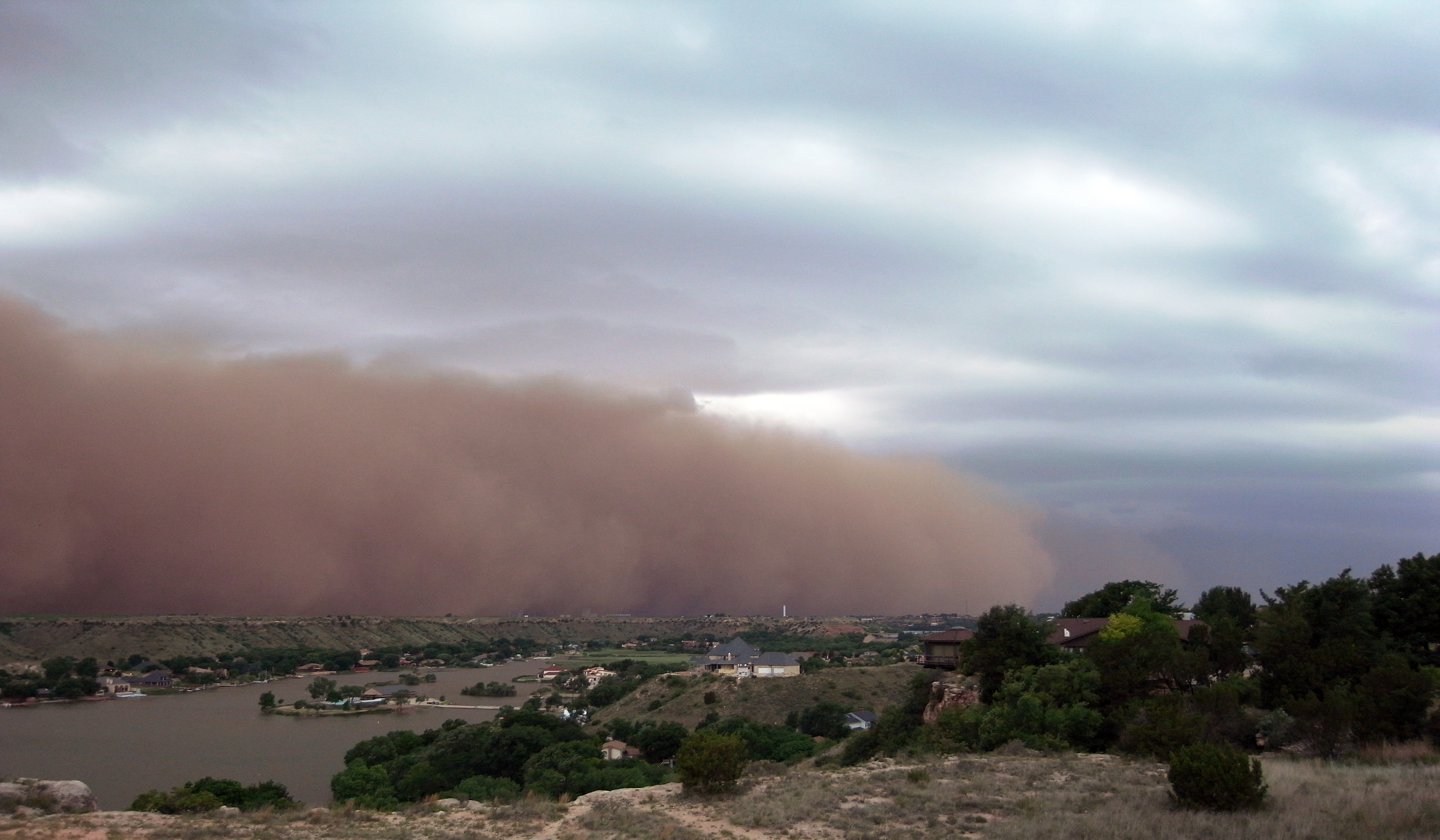
Dust cloud moving across the Llano Estacado near Ransom Canyon, Texas

The Great Plains are the westernmost portion of the vast North American Interior Plains, which extend east to the Appalachian Plateau. The United States Geological Survey divides the Great Plains in the United States into ten physiographic subdivisions:

- Missouri Coteau or Missouri Plateau (which also extends into Canada), glaciated – east central South Dakota, northern and eastern North Dakota and northeastern Montana;
- Coteau du Missouri, unglaciated – western South Dakota, northeastern Wyoming, southwestern North Dakota and southeastern Montana;
- Black Hills – western South Dakota;
- High Plains – southeastern Wyoming, southwestern South Dakota, western Nebraska (including the Sand Hills), eastern Colorado, western Kansas, western Oklahoma, eastern New Mexico, and northwestern Texas (including the Llano Estacado and Texas Panhandle);
- Plains Border – central Kansas and northern Oklahoma (including the Flint, Red and Smoky Hills);
- Colorado Piedmont – eastern Colorado;
- Raton section – northeastern New Mexico;
- Pecos Valley – eastern New Mexico;
- Edwards Plateau – south central Texas; and
- Central Texas section – central Texas.

Further to this can be added Canadian physiographic sub-regions such as the Alberta Plain, Cypress Hills, Manitoba Escarpment (eastward), Manitoba Plain, Missouri Coteau (shared), Rocky Mountain Foothills (eastward), and Saskatchewan Plain.

The Great Plains consist of a broad stretch of country underlain by nearly horizontal strata extending westward from the 97th meridian west to the base of the Rocky Mountains, a distance of 300 to 500 mi (480 to 800 km). It extends northward from the Mexican boundary far into Canada. Although the altitude of the plains increases gradually from 600 ft (180 m) or 1,200 ft (370 m) on the east to 4,000–5,000 ft (1,200–1,500 m) or 6,000 ft (1,800 m) near the mountains, the local relief is generally small. The semi-arid climate excludes tree growth and opens far-reaching views.

The plains are by no means a simple unit. They are of diverse structure and of various stages of erosional development. They are occasionally interrupted by buttes and escarpments. They are frequently broken by valleys. Yet on the whole, a broadly extended surface of moderate relief so often prevails that the name, Great Plains, for the region as a whole is well-deserved.

The western boundary of the plains is usually well-defined by the abrupt ascent of the mountains. The eastern boundary of the plains (in the United States) is more climatic than topographic. The line of 20 in (510 mm) of annual rainfall trends a little east of northward near the 97th meridian. If a boundary must be drawn where nature presents only a gradual transition, this rainfall line may be taken to divide the drier plains from the moister prairies. However, in Canada the eastern boundary of the plains is well defined by the presence of the Canadian Shield to the northeast.

The plains (within the United States) may be described in northern, intermediate, central and southern sections, in relation to certain peculiar features. In Canada, no such division is used: the climatic and vegetation regions are more impactful on human settlement than mere topography, and therefore the region is split into (from north to south), the taiga plains, boreal plains, aspen parkland, and prairie ecoregion regions.

=== Northern Great Plains ===
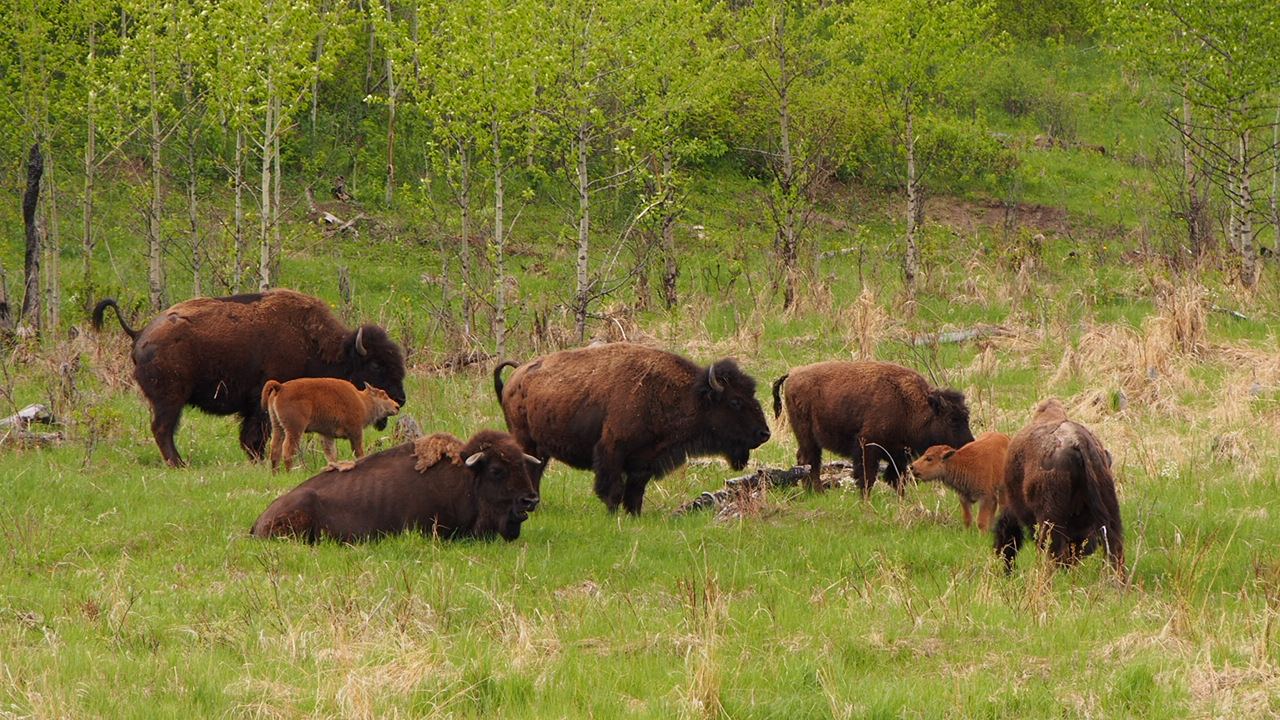
Herd of plains bison of various ages resting in Elk Island Park, Alberta

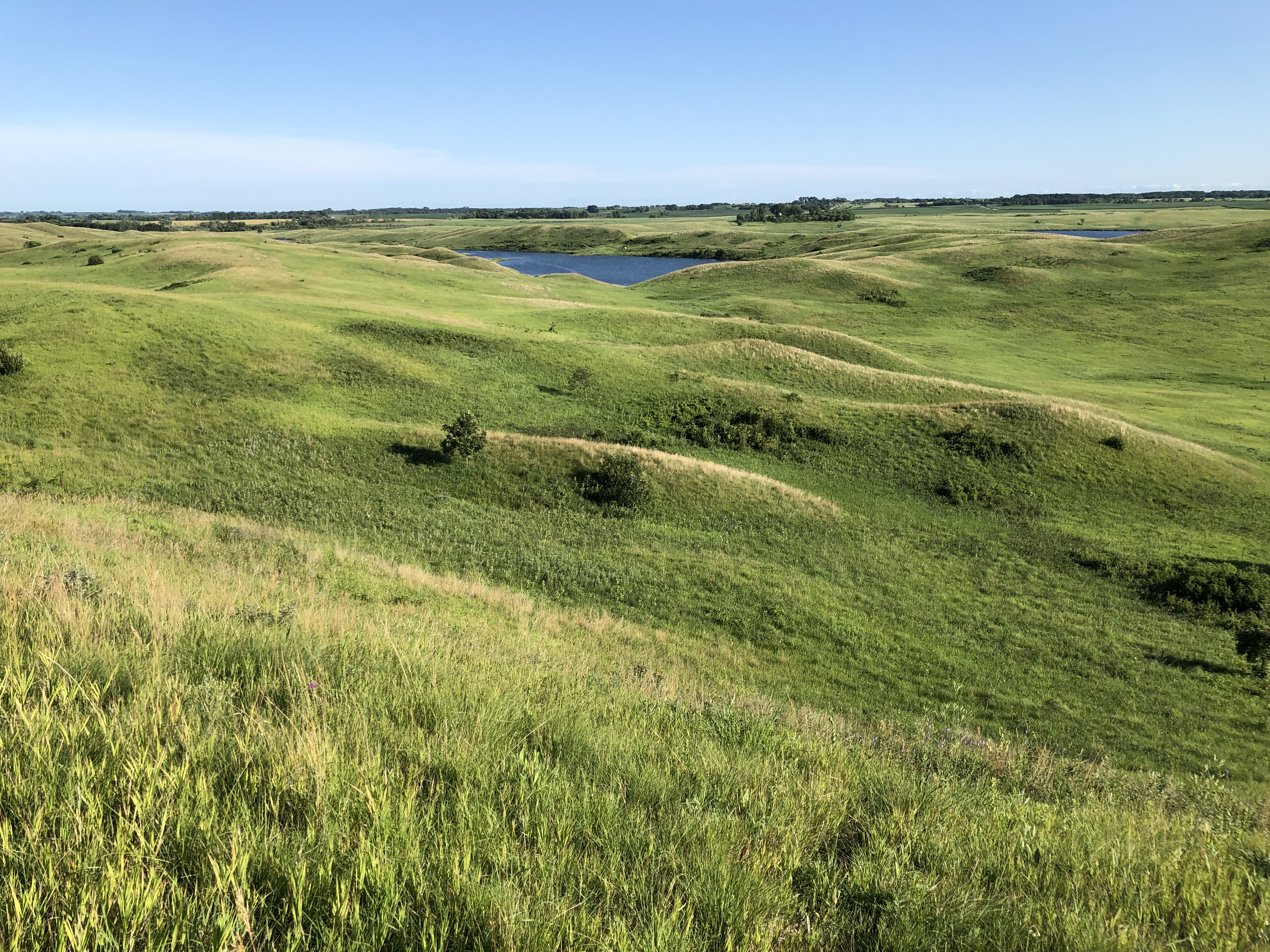
The Great Plains as seen in Minnesota's upland prairie at Glacial Lakes State Park

The northern section of the Great Plains, north of latitude 44°, includes eastern Montana, eastern Wyoming, most of North Dakota and South Dakota, southwestern Minnesota and portions of the Canadian provinces including southeastern Alberta, southern Saskatchewan and southwestern Manitoba. The strata here are Cretaceous or early Tertiary, lying nearly horizontal. The surface is shown to be a plain of degradation by a gradual ascent here and there to the crest of a ragged escarpment, the escarpment-remnant of a resistant stratum. There are also the occasional lava-capped mesas and dike formed ridges, surmounting the general level by 500 ft (150 m) or more and manifestly demonstrating the widespread erosion of the surrounding plains. All these reliefs are more plentiful towards the mountains in central Montana. The peneplain is no longer in the cycle of erosion that witnessed its production. It appears to have suffered a regional uplift or increase in elevation, for the upper Missouri River and its branches no longer flow on the surface of the plain, but in well graded, maturely opened valleys, several hundred feet below the general level. A significant exception to the rule of mature valleys occurs, however, in the case of the Missouri, the largest river, which is broken by several falls on hard sandstones about 50 mi (80 km) east of the mountains. This peculiar feature is explained as the result of displacement of the river from a better graded preglacial valley by the Pleistocene ice sheet. Here, the ice sheet overspread the plains from the moderately elevated Canadian highlands far on the north-east, instead of from the much higher mountains nearby on the west. The present altitude of the plains near the mountain base is 4,000 ft (1,200 m).

The northern plains are interrupted by several small mountain areas. The Black Hills, chiefly in western South Dakota, are the largest group. They rise like a large island from the sea, occupying an oval area of about 100 mi (160 km) north-south by 50 mi (80 km) east-west. At Black Elk Peak, they reach an altitude of 7,216 ft (2,199 m) and have an effective relief over the plains of 2,000 or 3,000 ft (610 or 910 m) This mountain mass is of flat-arched, dome-like structure, now well dissected by radiating consequent streams. The weaker uppermost strata have been eroded down to the level of the plains where their upturned edges are evenly truncated. The next following harder strata have been sufficiently eroded to disclose the core of underlying igneous and metamorphic crystalline rocks in about half of the domed area.

=== Intermediate Great Plains ===
In the intermediate section of the plains, between latitudes 44° and 42°, including southern South Dakota and northern Nebraska, the erosion of certain large districts is peculiarly elaborate. Known as the Badlands, it is a minutely dissected form with a relief of a few hundred feet. This is due to several causes:

- the dry climate, which prevents the growth of a grassy turf
- the fine texture of the Tertiary strata in the badland districts
- every little rill, at times of rain, carves its own little valley.

=== Central Great Plains ===
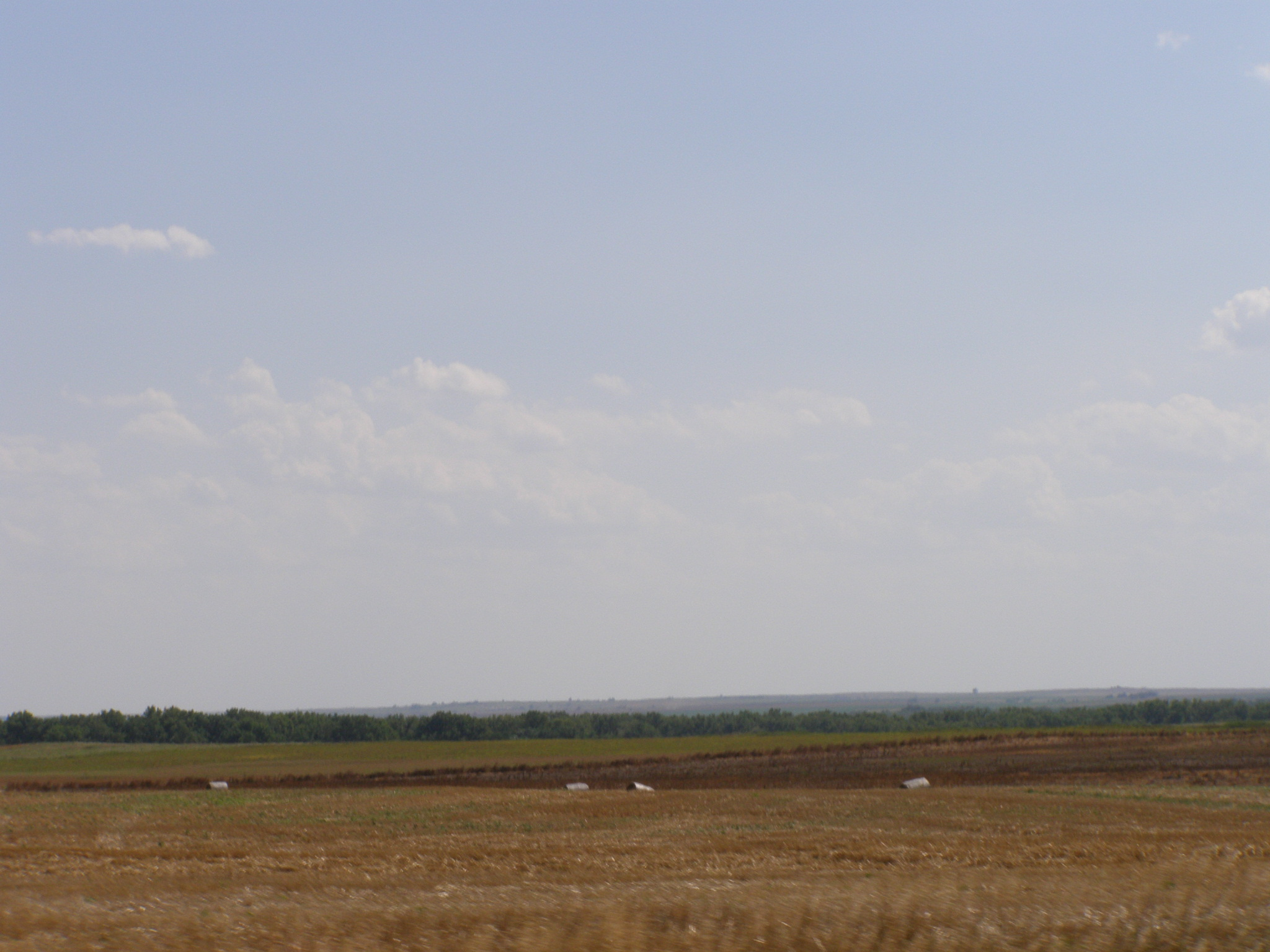
The High Plains of Kansas, in the Smoky Hills near Nicodemus

The central section of the Great Plains, between latitudes 42° and 36°, occupying eastern Colorado and western Kansas, is mostly a dissected fluviatile plain. That is, this section was once smoothly covered with a gently sloping plain of gravel and sand that had been spread far forward on a broad denuded area as a piedmont deposit by the rivers which issued from the mountains. Since then, it has been more or less dissected by the erosion of valleys. The central section of the plains thus presents a marked contrast to the northern section.

While the northern section owes its smoothness to the removal of local gravels and sands from a formerly uneven surface by the action of degrading rivers and their inflowing tributaries, the southern section owes its smoothness to the deposition of imported gravels and sands upon a previously uneven surface by the action of aggrading rivers and their outgoing distributaries. The two sections are also alike in that residual eminences still here and there surmount the peneplain of the northern section, while the fluviatile plain of the central section completely buried the pre-existent relief. An exception to this statement must be made for the southwest, close to the mountains in southern Colorado, where some lava-capped mesas (Mesa de Maya, Raton Mesa) stand several thousand feet above the general plain level, and thus testify to the widespread erosion of this region before it was aggraded.

=== Southern Great Plains ===
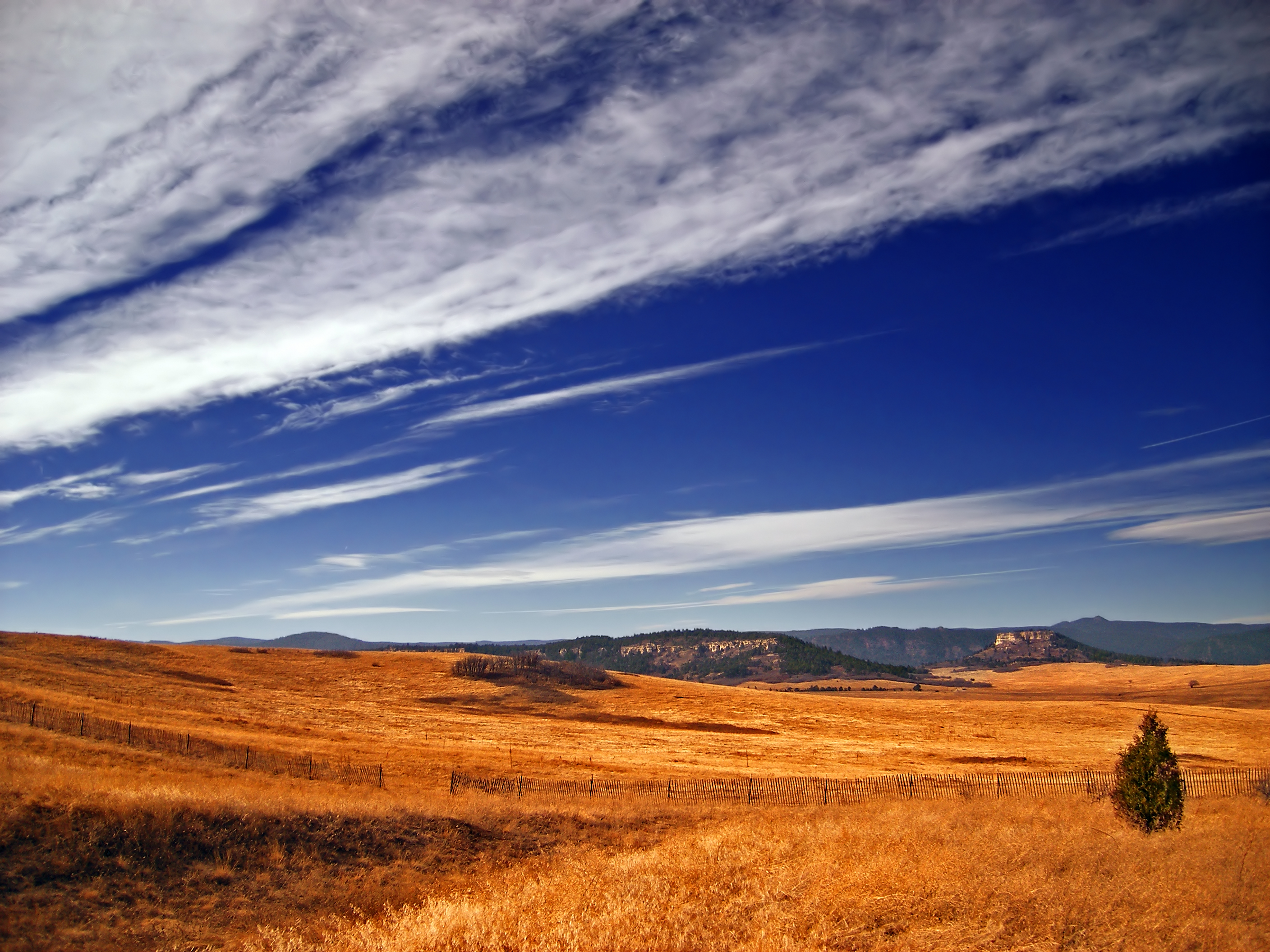
Short-grass prairie near the front range of the Rockies in Colorado

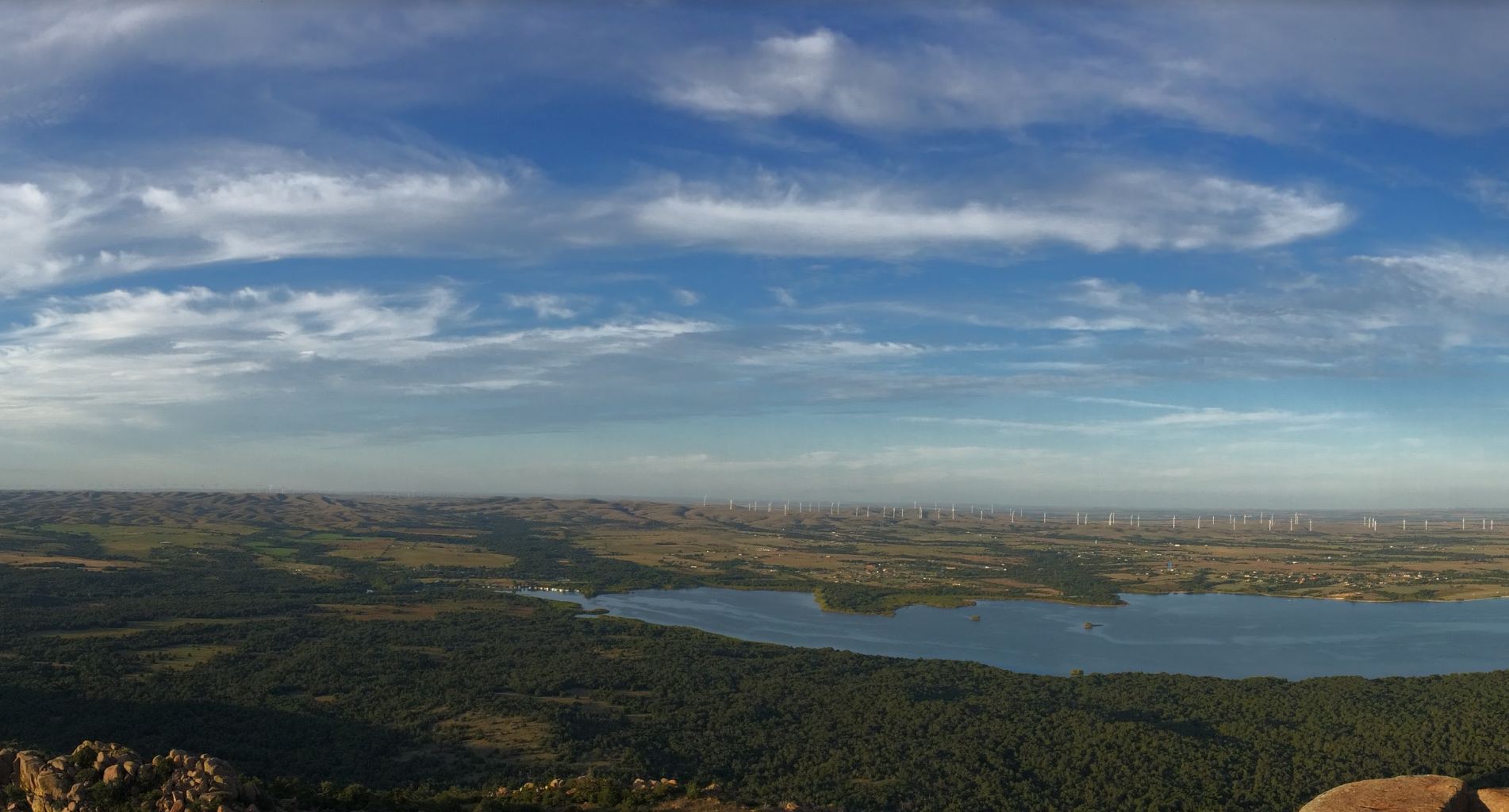
View of Lake Lawtonka and wind turbines from Mount Scott, Oklahoma

The southern section of the Great Plains, between latitudes 35.5° and 25.5°, lies in western Texas, eastern New Mexico, and western Oklahoma. Like the central section, it is for the most part a dissected fluviatile plain. However, the lower lands which surround it on all sides place it in such strong relief that it stands up as a table-land, known from the time of Mexican occupation as the Llano Estacado. It measures roughly 150 mi (240 km) east-west and 400 mi (640 km) north-south. It is of very irregular outline, narrowing to the south. Its altitude is 5,500 ft (1,700 m) at the highest western point, nearest the mountains whence its gravels were supplied. From there, it slopes southeastward at a decreasing rate, first about 12 ft (3.7 m), then about 7 ft/mi (1.3 m/km), to its eastern and southern borders, where it is 2,000 ft (610 m) in altitude. Like the High Plains farther north, it is extraordinarily smooth.

It is very dry, except for occasional shallow and temporary water sheets after rains. Llano is separated from the plains on the north by the mature consequent valley of the Canadian River, and from the mountains on the west by the broad and probably mature valley of the Pecos River. On the east, it is strongly undercut by the retrogressive erosion of the headwaters of the Red, Brazos, and Colorado rivers of Texas and presents a ragged escarpment approximately 500 to 800 ft (150 to 240 m) high, overlooking the central denuded area of that state. There, between the Brazos and Colorado rivers, occurs a series of isolated outliers capped by limestone that underlies both the Llano Uplift on the west and the Grand Prairies escarpment on the east. The southern and narrow part of the table-land, called the Edwards Plateau, is more dissected than the rest, and falls off to the south in a frayed-out fault scarp. This scarp overlooks the coastal plain of the Rio Grande embayment. The central denuded area, east of the Llano, resembles the east-central section of the plains in exposing older rocks. Between these two similar areas, in the space limited by the Canadian and Red Rivers, rise the subdued forms of the Wichita Mountains in Oklahoma, the westernmost member of the Ouachita system.

=== Other terminology ===
The term "Western Plains" is used to describe the ecoregion of the Great Plains, or alternatively the western portion of the Great Plains.

== Climate ==
In general, the Great Plains have a wide range of weather, with very cold and harsh winters and very hot and humid summers. Wind speeds are often very high, especially in winter.

The 100th meridian roughly corresponds with the line that divides the Great Plains into an area that receives 20 in (510 mm) or more of rainfall per year and an area that receives less than 20 in (510 mm). In this context, the High Plains, as well as Southern Alberta, south-western Saskatchewan and Eastern Montana are mainly semi-arid steppe land and are generally characterised by rangeland or marginal farmland. The region (especially the High Plains) is periodically subjected to extended periods of drought; high winds in the region may then generate devastating dust storms. The eastern Great Plains near the eastern boundary falls in the humid subtropical climate zone in the southern areas, and the northern and central areas fall in the humid continental climate.

Many thunderstorms occur in the plains in the spring through summer. The southeastern portion of the Great Plains is the most tornado-active area in the world and is sometimes referred to as Tornado Alley.

== Ecology ==
=== Flora ===
The Great Plains are part of the floristic North American Prairies province, which extends from the Rocky Mountains to the Appalachians.

=== Fauna ===
==== Mammals ====
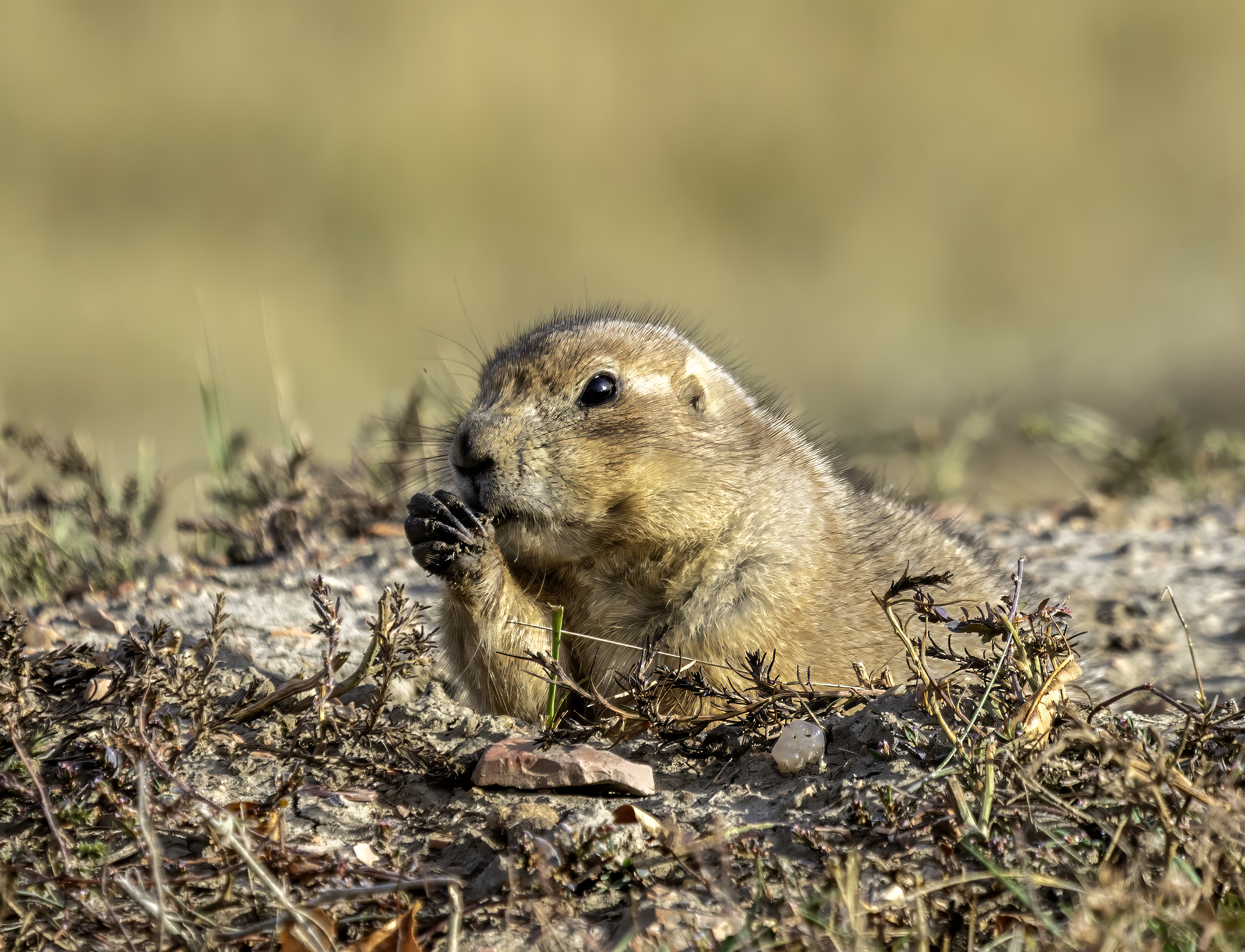
A black-tailed prairie dog in Theodore Roosevelt National Park, North Dakota, USA

Although the American bison (Bison bison) historically ranged throughout much of North America (from New York to Oregon and Canada to northern Mexico), they are strongly associated with the Great Plains where they once roamed in immense herds. Pronghorn (Antilocapra americana) range into western areas of the region. The black-tailed prairie dog (Cynomys ludovicianus) is another iconic species among several rodents that are linked to the region including the thirteen-lined ground squirrel (Ictidomys tridecemlineatus), spotted ground squirrel (Xerospermophilus spilosoma), Franklin's ground squirrel (Poliocitellus franklinii), plains pocket gopher (Geomys bursarius), hispid pocket mouse (Chaetodipus hispidus), olive-backed pocket mouse (Perognathus fasciatus), plains pocket mouse (Perognathus flavescens), and plains harvest mouse (Reithrodontomys montanus), Two carnivores associated with the Great Plains include the swift fox (Vulpes velox) and the endangered black-footed ferret (Mustela nigripes).

==== Birds ====
The lesser prairie-chicken (Tympanuchus pallidicinctus) is endemic to the Great Plains and the distribution of the greater prairie-chicken (Tympanuchus cupido) predominantly occurs in the region, although the latter historically ranged further eastward. The Harris's sparrow (Zonotrichia querula) spends winter months in southern areas of the region. Other species migrate from the south in the spring and spend their breeding season on the plains, including the white-faced ibis (Plegadis chihi), mountain plover (Anarhynchus montanus), marbled godwit (Limosa fedoa), Sprague's pipit (Anthus spragueii), Cassin's sparrow (Peucaea cassinii), Baird's sparrow (Centronyx bairdii), lark bunting (Calamospiza melanocorys), chestnut-collared longspur (Calcarius ornatus), thick-billed longspur or McCown's longspur (Rhynchophanes mccownii), and dickcissel (Spiza americana).

==== Reptiles ====
The prairie rattlesnake (Crotalus viridis) ranges throughout much of the Great Plains and into the valleys and lower elevations of the eastern Rocky Mountains and portions of the American southwest. Other snakes include the plains hog-nosed snake (Heterodon nasicus), western milksnake (Lampropeltis gentilis), Great Plains ratsnake (Pantherophis emoryi), bullsnake (Pituophis catenifer sayi), plains black-headed snake (Tantilla nigriceps), plains gartersnake (Thamnophis radix), and lined snake (Tropidoclonion lineatum). Reptile diversity increases significantly in southern regions of the Great Plains. The ornate box turtle (Terrapene ornata) and Great Plains skink (Plestiodon obsoletus) occur in southern areas.

==== Amphibians ====
Although few salamanders are strongly associated with the region, the western tiger salamander (Ambystoma mavortium) ranges through much of the Great Plains and the Rocky Mountains, as does the Rocky Mountain toad (Anaxyrus w. woodhousi). Other anurans related to region include the Great Plains toad (Anaxyrus cognatus), plains leopard frog (Lithobates blairi), and plains spadefoot toad (Spea bombifrons).

==== Fish ====
Some species predominantly associated with various river basins in the Great Plains include sturgeon chub (Macrhybopsis gelida), peppered chub (Macrhybopsis tetranema), prairie chub (Macrhybopsis australis), western silvery minnow (Hybognathus argyritis), plains minnow (Hybognathus placitus), smalleye shiner (Notropis buccula), Arkansas River shiner (Notropis girardi), Red River shiner (Notropis bairdi), Topeka shiner (Notropis topeka), plains topminnow (Fundulus sciadicus), plains killifish (Fundulus zebrinus), Red River pupfish (Cyprinodon rubrofluviatilis), and Arkansas darter (Etheostoma cragini).

==== Invertebrates ====
The Great Plains also has many invertebrate species living here both alive and extinct such as the American burying beetle (Nicrophorus americus), Salt Creek tiger beetle (Cinidela nevadica lincolniana), Great Plains giant tiger beetle (Amblycheila chylindriformis), Microstylum morosum, bean leaf beetle (Cerotoma trifurcata), Great Plains camel cricket (Daihinia brevipes), and the Great Plains spittlebug (Lepyronia gibbosa). Some species in the Great Plains have gone extinct like the Rocky Mountain locust (Melanoplus spretus).

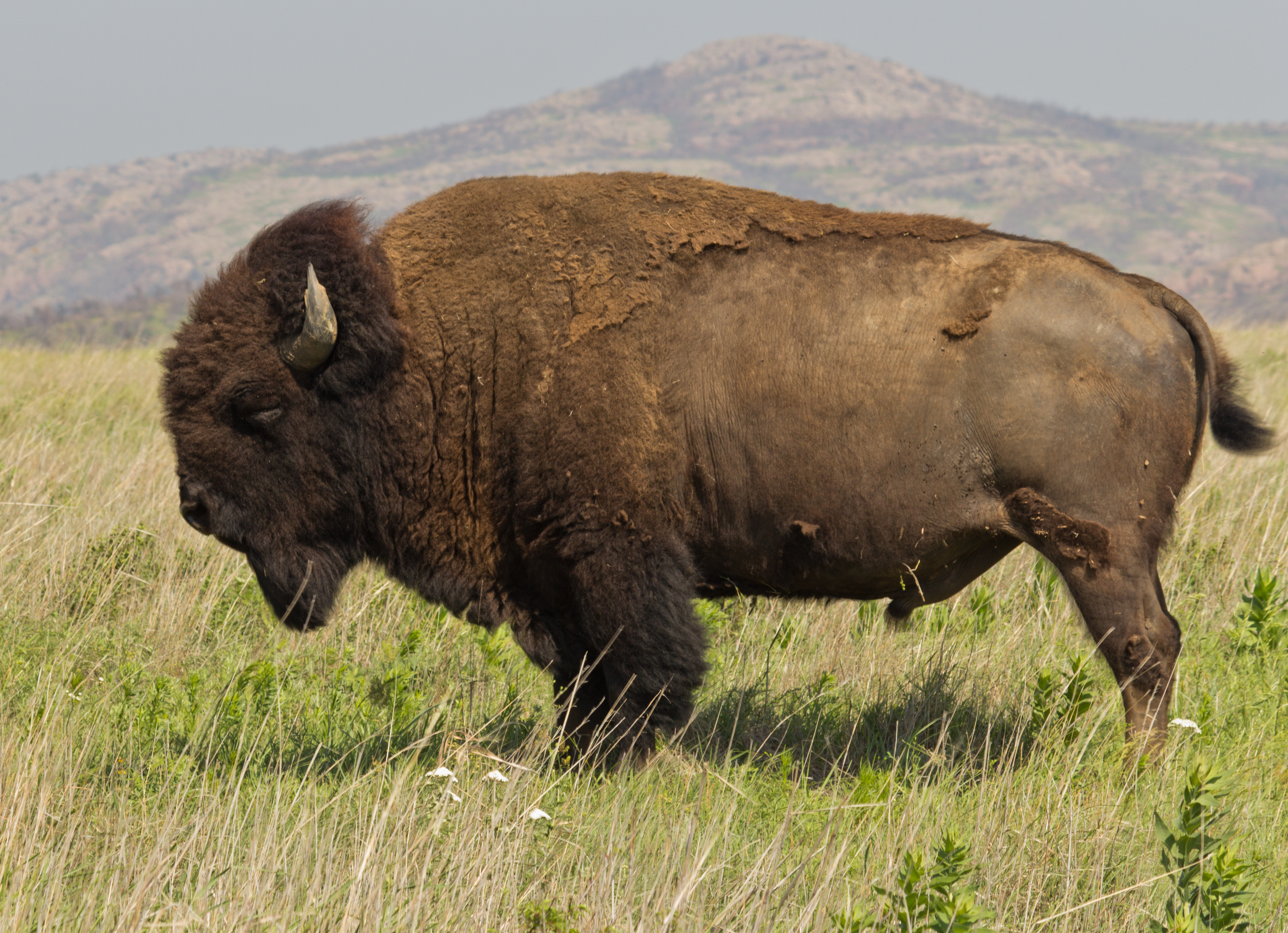
American bison (Bison bison), Wichita Mountain Wildlife Refuge, Oklahoma

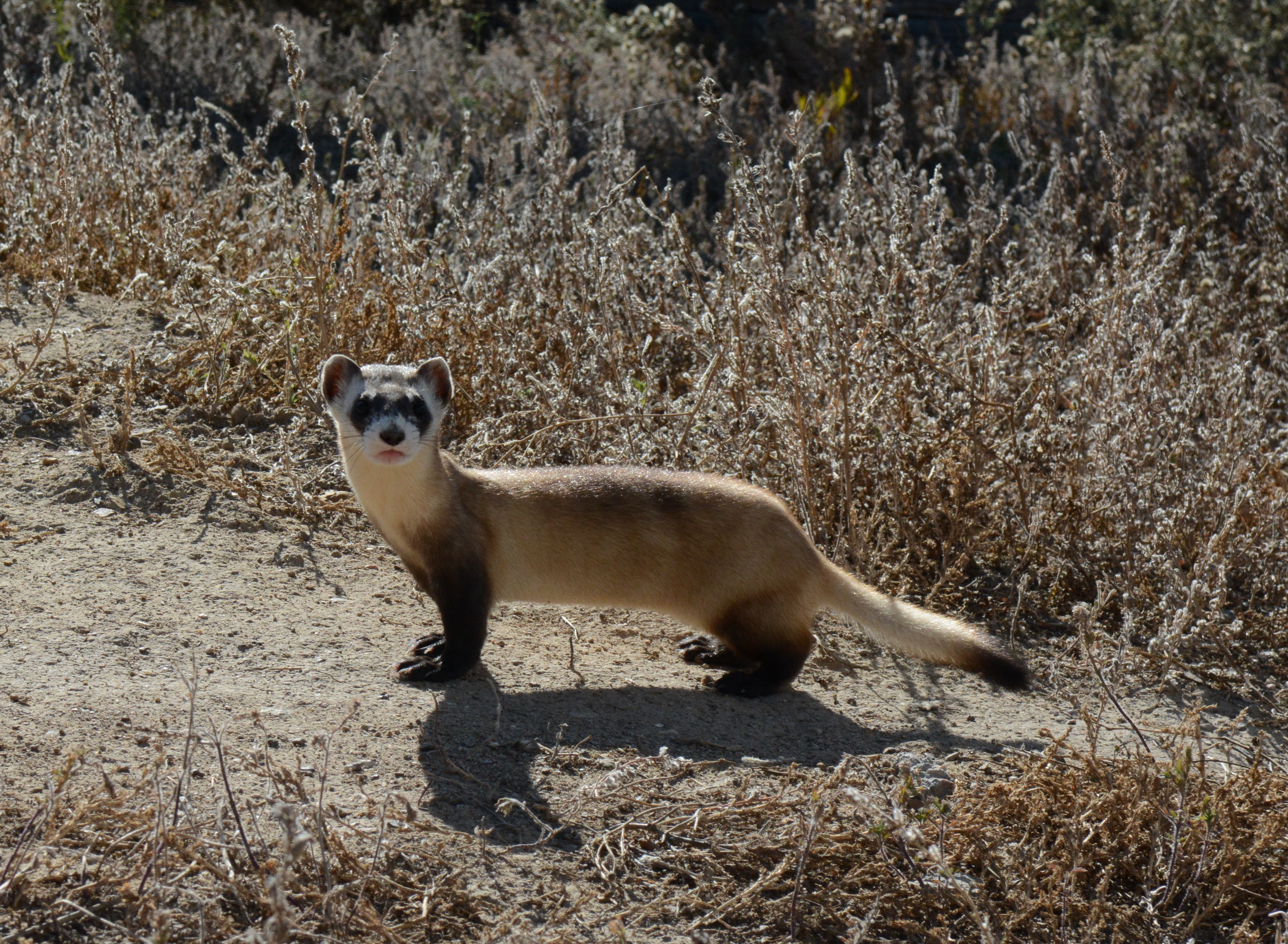
Black-footed ferret (Mustela nigripes) National Black-footed Ferret Conservation Center, Colorado

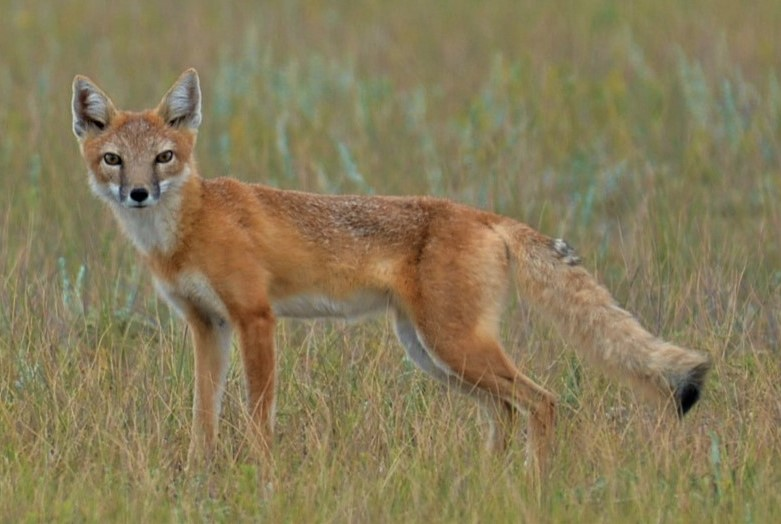
Swift fox (Vulpes velox), Colorado

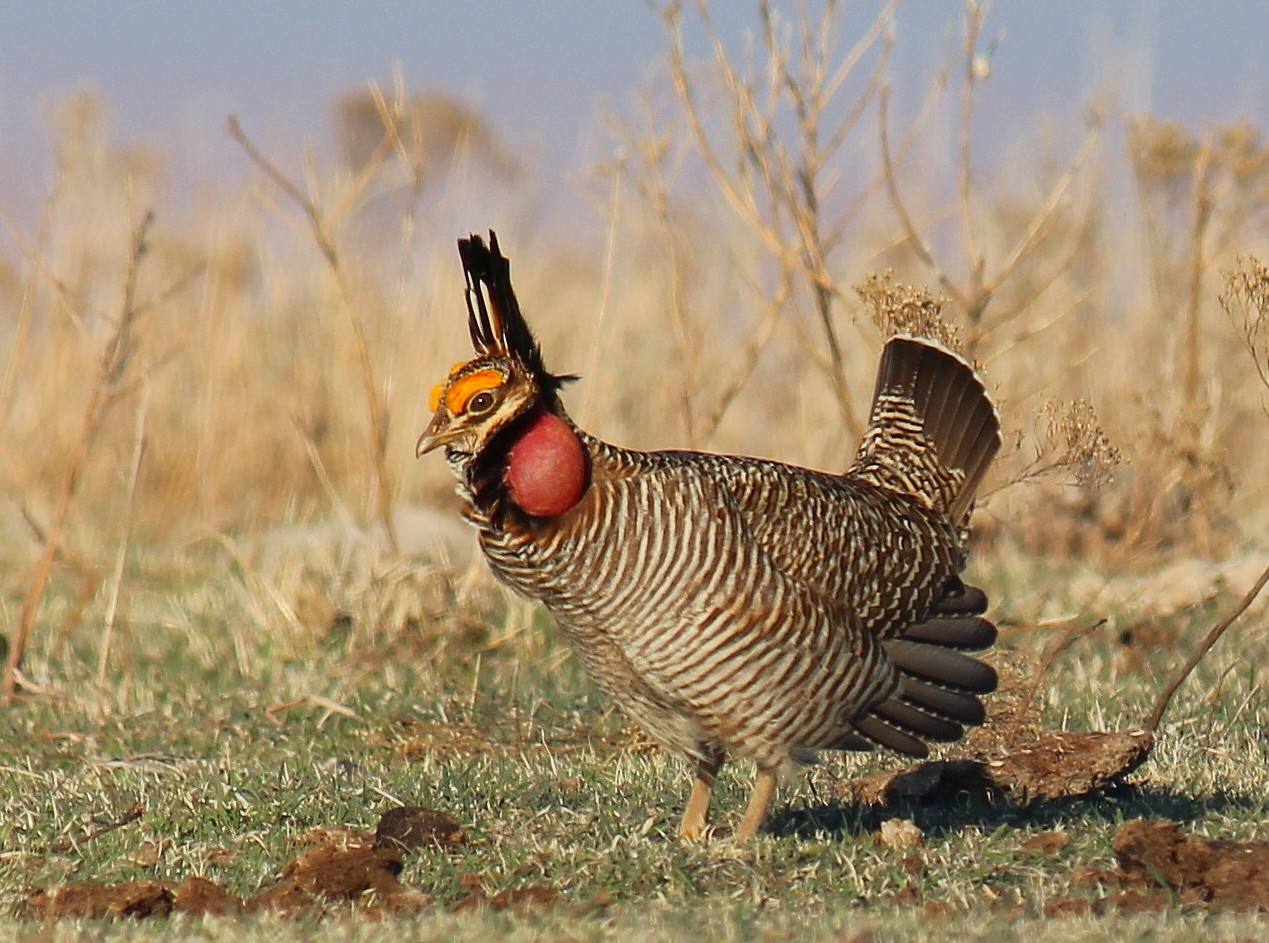
Lesser prairie-chicken (Tympanuchus pallidicinctus) on a lek in the Red Hills of Kansas

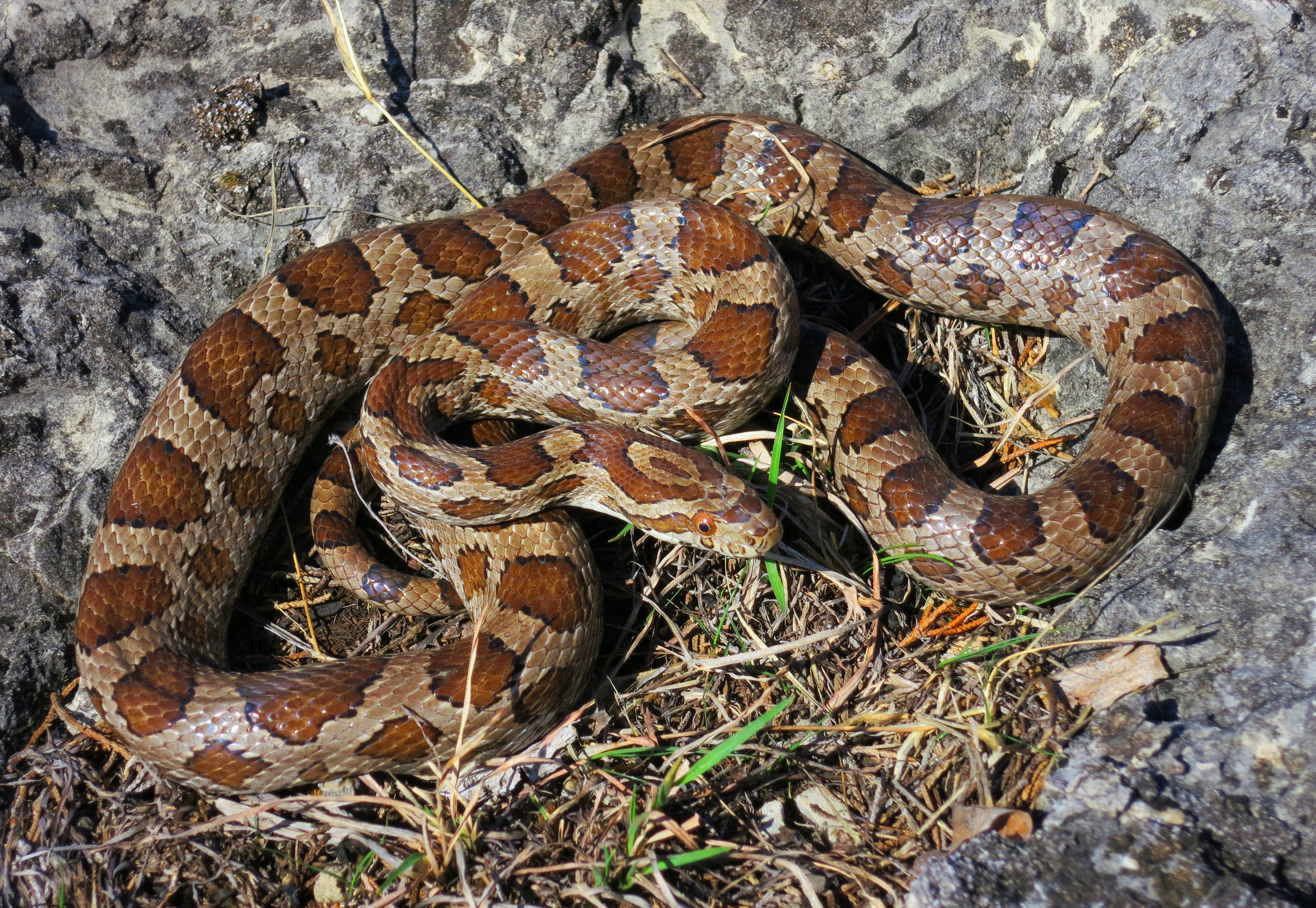
Great Plains ratsnake (Pantherophis emoryi), Missouri

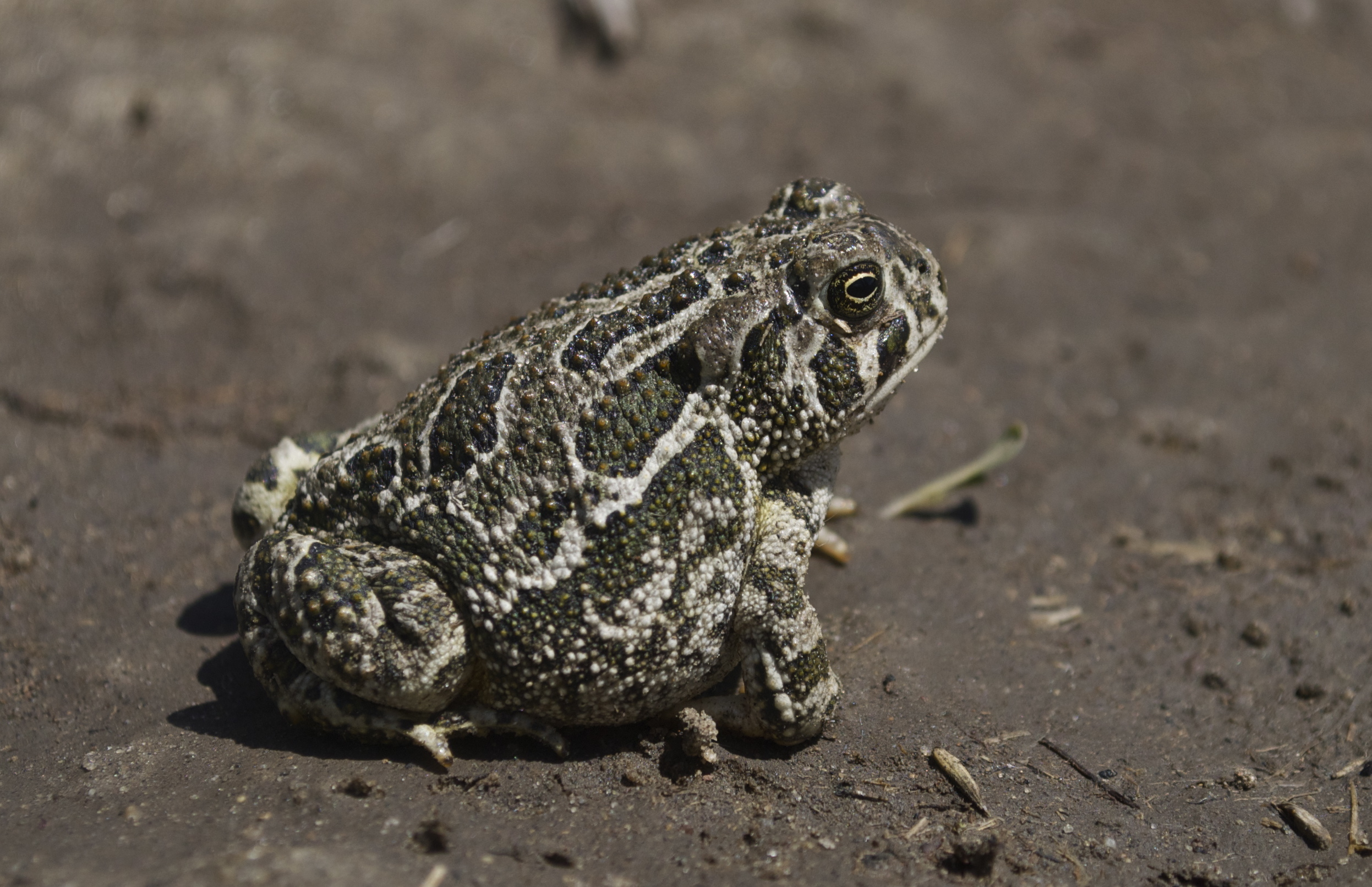
Great Plains toad (Anaxyrus cognatus)

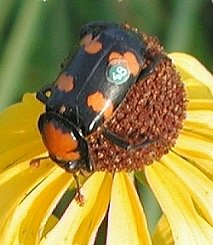
Nicrophorus americanus

=== Paleontology ===
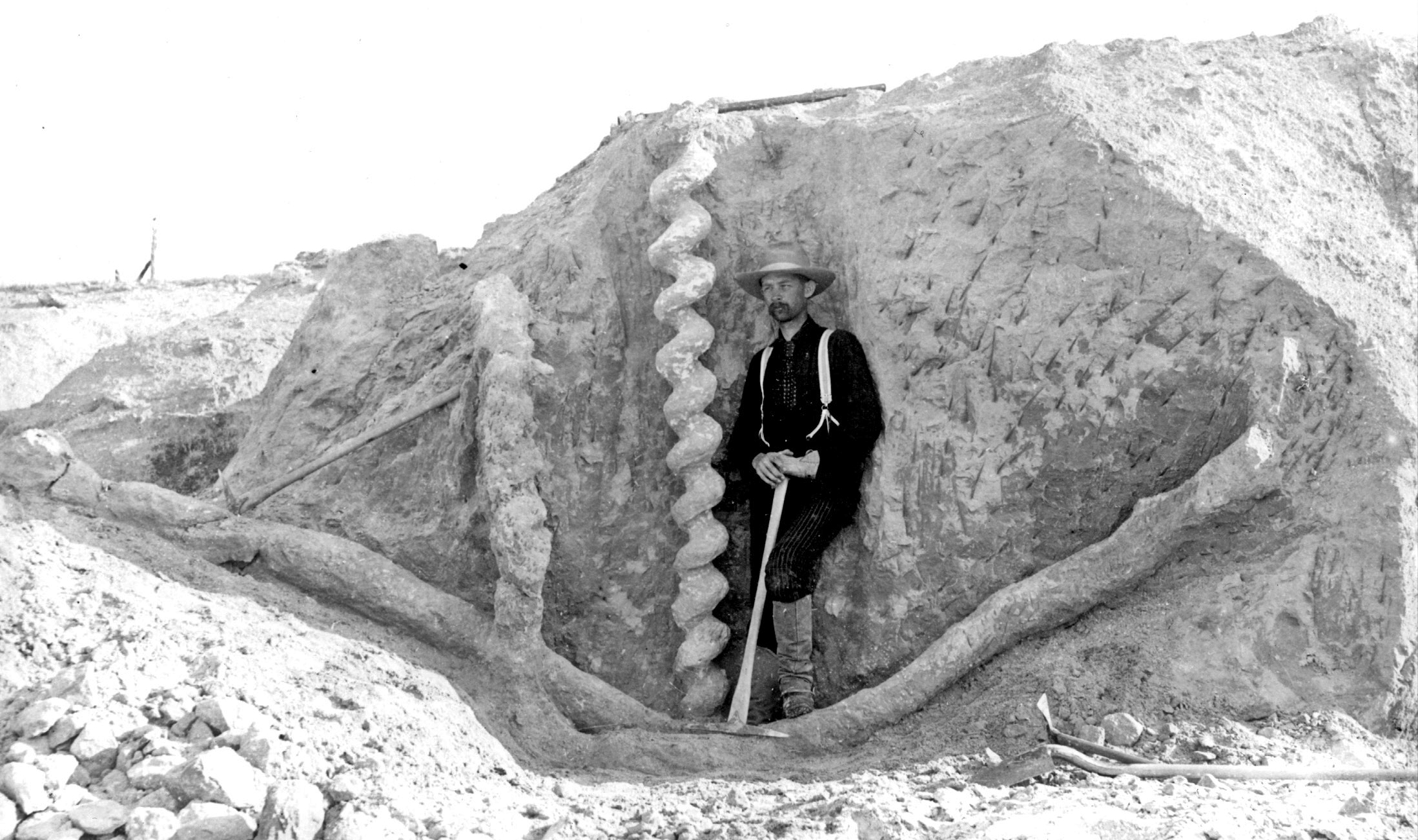
Excavation of a fossil Daemonelix burrow at Agate Fossil Beds National Monument.

During the Cretaceous Period (145–66 million years ago), the Great Plains were covered by a shallow inland sea called the Western Interior Seaway. However, during the Late Cretaceous to the Paleocene (65–55 million years ago), the seaway had begun to recede, leaving behind thick marine deposits and a relatively flat terrain which the seaway had once occupied.

During the Cenozoic era, specifically about 25 million years ago during the Miocene and Pliocene epochs, the continental climate became favorable to the evolution of grasslands. Existing forest biomes declined and grasslands became much more widespread. The grasslands provided a new niche for mammals, including many ungulates and glires, that switched from browsing diets to grazing diets. Traditionally, the spread of grasslands and the development of grazers have been strongly linked. However, an examination of mammalian teeth suggests that it is the open, gritty habitat and not the grass itself which is linked to diet changes in mammals, giving rise to the "grit, not grass" hypothesis.

Paleontological finds in the area have yielded bones of mammoths, saber-toothed cats and other ancient animals, as well as dozens of other megafauna (large animals over 100 lb [45 kg]) – such as giant sloths, horses, mastodons, and American lion – that dominated the area of the ancient Great Plains for thousands to millions of years. The vast majority of these animals became extinct in North America at the end of the Pleistocene (around 13,000 years ago).

A number of significant fossil sites are located in the Great Plains including Agate Fossil Beds National Monument (Nebraska), Ashfall Fossil Beds (Nebraska), Clayton Lake State Park (New Mexico), Dinosaur Valley State Park (Texas), Hudson-Meng Bison Kill (Nebraska), Makoshika State Park (Montana), and The Mammoth Site (South Dakota).

=== Public and protected lands ===
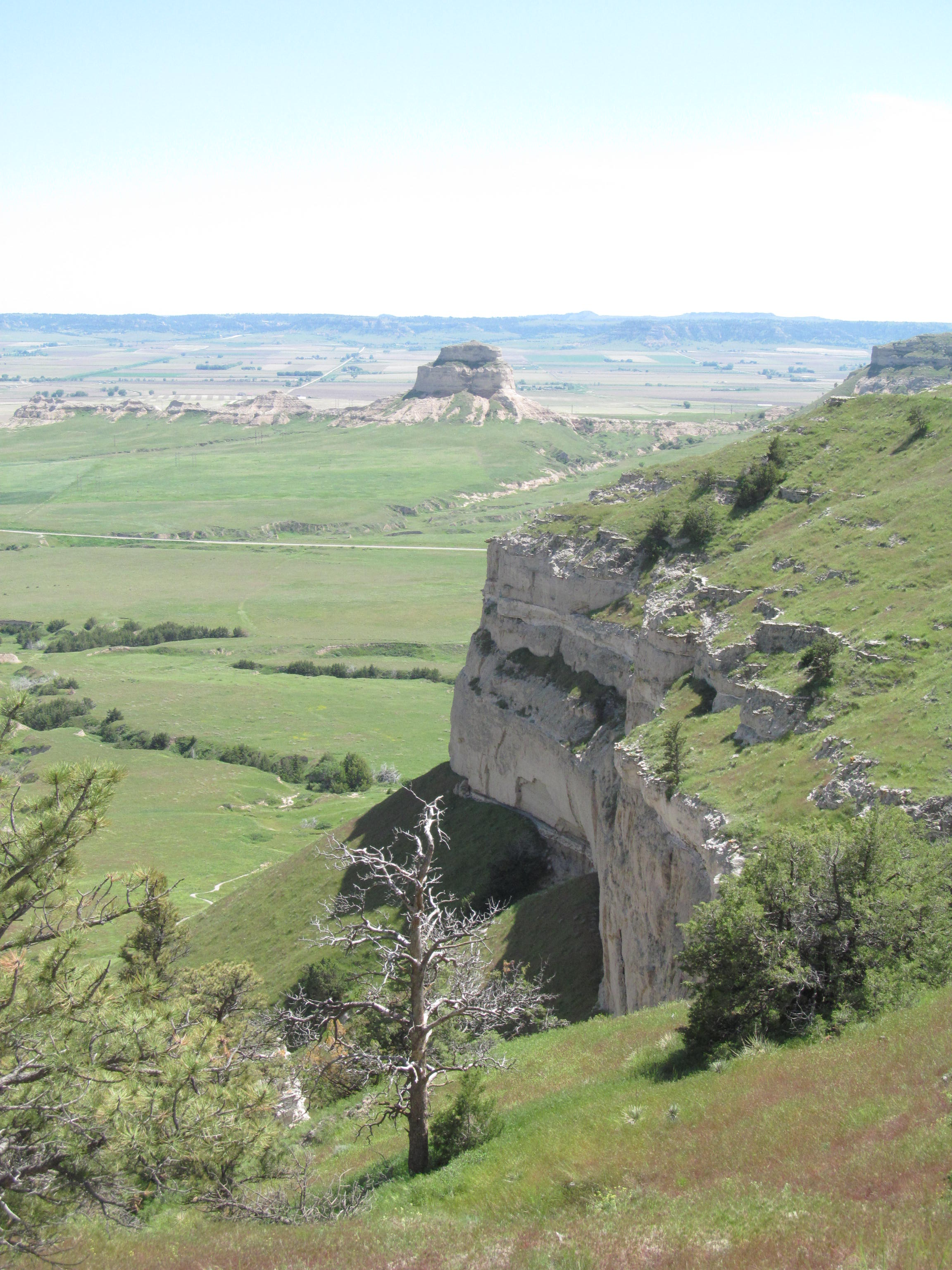
Scotts Bluff National Monument, Nebraska

Public and protected lands in the Great Plains include National Parks and National Monuments, administers by the National Park Service with the responsibility of preserving ecological and historical places and making them available to the public. The U.S. Fish & Wildlife Service manages the National Wildlife Refuges, with the primary responsibility of conserving and protecting fish, wildlife, plants, and habitat in the public trust. Both are agencies of the Department of the Interior.

In contrast, U.S. Forest Service, an agency of the U. S. Department of Agriculture, administers the National Forests and National Grasslands, under a multiple-use concept. By law, the U.S. Forest Service must consider all resources, with no single resource emphasized to the detriment of others, including water, soil, grazing, timber harvesting, and minerals (mining and drilling), as well as recreation and conservation of fish and wildlife. Each individual state also administers state lands, typically smaller areas, for various purposes including conservation and recreation.

Grasslands are among the least protected biomes. Humans have converted much of the prairies for agricultural purposes or to create pastures. Several of the protected lands in the region are centered around aberrant and uncharacteristic features of the region, such as mountains, outcrops, and canyons (e.g. Devil's Tower National Monument, Wind Cave National Park, Scotts Bluff National Monument), and as splendid and worthy as they are, they are not primarily focused on conserving the plains and prairies.

United States:

- Colorado:
  - Comanche National Grassland (443,081 acres [179,309 ha])
  - Pawnee National Grassland (193,060 acres [78,130 ha])
- Iowa:
  - DeSoto National Wildlife Refuge (8,362 acres [3,384 ha])
- Kansas:
  - Cheyenne Bottoms Wildlife Area (41,000 acres [17,000 ha])
  - Cimarron National Grassland (108,176 acres [43,777 ha])
  - Flint Hills National Wildlife Refuge (18,463 acres [7,472 ha])
  - Kirwin National Wildlife Refuge (10,778 acres [4,362 ha])
  - Marais des Cygnes National Wildlife Refuge (7,500 acres [3,000 ha])
  - Tallgrass Prairie National Preserve (10,882 acres [4,404 ha])
  - Quivira National Wildlife Refuge (22,135 acres [8,958 ha])
- Minnesota:
  - Agassiz National Wildlife Refuge (61,500 acres [24,900 ha])
  - Big Stone National Wildlife Refuge (11,586 acres [4,689 ha])
  - Blue Mounds State Park (1,567 acres [634 ha])
  - Glacial Lakes State Park (2,423 acres [981 ha])
- Missouri:
  - Loess Bluffs National Wildlife Refuge (7,350 acres [2,970 ha])
- Montana:
  - Charles M. Russell National Wildlife Refuge (915,814 acres [370,617 ha])
  - Makoshika State Park (11,538 acres [4,669 ha])
  - Medicine Lake National Wildlife Refuge (31,533 acres [12,761 ha])
  - Rosebud Battlefield State Park (3,052 acres [1,235 ha])
  - UL Bend National Wildlife Refuge (56,048 acres [22,682 ha])
  - Upper Missouri River Breaks National Monument (377,000 acres [153,000 ha])
- Nebraska:
  - Boyer Chute National Wildlife Refuge (4,040 acres [1,630 ha])
  - Crescent Lake National Wildlife Refuge (45,818 acres [18,542 ha])
  - Fort Niobrara National Wildlife Refuge (19,131 acres [7,742 ha])
  - John and Louise Seier National Wildlife Refuge (2,400 acres [970 ha])
  - North Platte National Wildlife Refuge (5,047 acres [2,042 ha])
  - Rainwater Basin Wetland Management District (22,864 acres [9,253 ha])
  - Scotts Bluff National Monument (3,000 acres [1,200 ha])
  - Valentine National Wildlife Refuge (71,516 acres [28,941 ha])
- New Mexico:
  - Grulla National Wildlife Refuge (3,236 acres [1,310 ha])
  - Kiowa National Grassland (137,131 acres [55,495 ha])
- North Dakota:
  - Arrowwood National Wildlife Refuge (15,934 acres [6,448 ha])
  - Audubon National Wildlife Refuge (14,739 acres [5,965 ha])
  - Little Missouri State Park (6,492 acres [2,627 ha])
  - Sheyenne National Grassland (70,180 acres [28,400 ha])
  - Theodore Roosevelt National Park (70,446 acres [28,508 ha])
- Oklahoma:
  - Black Kettle National Grassland (31,286 acres [12,661 ha])
  - Salt Plains National Wildlife Refuge (32,080 acres [12,980 ha])
  - Wichita Mountains Wildlife Refuge (59,000 acres [24,000 ha])
- South Dakota:
  - Badlands National Park (242,756 acres [98,240 ha])
  - Black Hills National Forest (1,253,308 acres [507,196 ha])
  - Custer State Park (71,000 acres [29,000 ha])
  - Fort Pierre National Grassland (115,890 acres [46,900 ha])
  - Grand River National Grassland (154,783 acres [62,638 ha])
  - Wind Cave National Park (33,847 acres [13,697 ha])
- Texas:
  - Buffalo Lake National Wildlife Refuge (7,664 acres [3,102 ha])
  - Caddo National Grassland (17,873 acres [7,233 ha])
  - Caprock Canyons State Park (15,313 acres [6,197 ha])
  - Hagerman National Wildlife Refuge (11,320 acres [4,580 ha])
  - Lyndon B. Johnson National Grassland (20,309 acres [8,219 ha])
  - Muleshoe National Wildlife Refuge (6,440 acres [2,610 ha])
  - Palo Duro Canyon State Park (26,200 acres [10,600 ha])
  - Rita Blanca National Grassland (230,000 acres [93,000 ha])
- Wyoming:
  - Curt Gowdy State Park (3,395 acres [1,374 ha])
  - Devil's Tower National Monument (1,346 acres [545 ha])
  - Glendo State Park (ca. 10,000 acres [4,000 ha])
  - Thunder Basin National Grassland (547,499 acres [221,565 ha])

Canada:

- Alberta:
  - Elk Island National Park (48,000 acres [19,000 ha])
  - Suffield National Wildlife Area (113,263 acres [45,836 ha])
- Manitoba:
  - Riding Mountain National Park (733,400 acres [296,800 ha])
  - Turtle Mountain Provincial Park (46,080 acres [18,650 ha])
- Saskatchewan:
  - Grasslands National Park (224,000 acres [91,000 ha])
  - Last Mountain Lake National Wildlife Area (38,553 acres [15,602 ha])

=== Ecological changes ===
The Great Plains biome is found to be at the brink of collapse due to woody plant encroachment, with 62% of Northern American grassland lost to date.

== History to 1850 ==
=== Original American contact ===
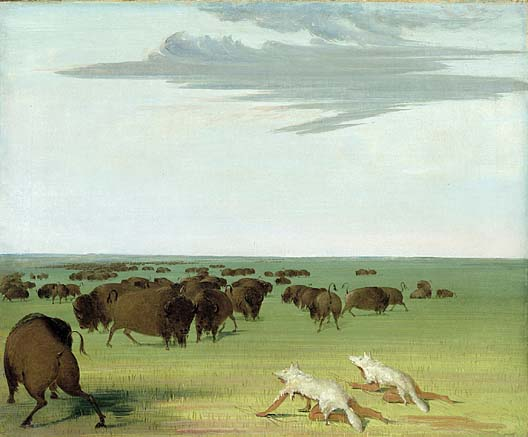
Buffalo hunt under the wolf-skin mask, George Catlin, 1832–33.

The first peoples (Paleo-Indians) arrived on the Great Plains thousands of years ago. The introduction of corn around 800 CE allowed the development of the mound-building Mississippian culture along rivers that crossed the Great Plains and that included trade networks west to the Rocky Mountains. Mississippians settled the Great Plains at sites now in Oklahoma and South Dakota.

Siouan language speakers may have originated in the lower Mississippi River region. They were agriculturalists and may have been part of the Mound Builder civilization during the 9th–12th centuries.

Pressure from other Indian tribes, themselves driven west and south by the encroachment of European settlers as well as economic incentives such as the fur trade, alongside the arrival of the horse and firearms from Europe pushed multiple tribes onto the Great Plains.

Among those to have lived on the Great Plains were the Blackfoot, Crow, Sioux, Cheyenne, Arapaho, Comanche, and others. Eastern portions of the Great Plains were inhabited by tribes who lived at Etzanoa and in semi-permanent villages of earth lodges, such as the Arikara, Mandan, Pawnee, and Wichita.

Wars with the Ojibwe and Cree peoples pushed the Lakota (Teton Sioux) west onto the Great Plains in the mid- to late-17th century. The Shoshone originated in the western Great Basin and spread north and east into present-day Idaho and Wyoming. By 1500, some Eastern Shoshone had crossed the Rocky Mountains into the Great Plains. After 1750, warfare and pressure from the Blackfoot, Crow, Lakota, Cheyenne, and Arapaho pushed Eastern Shoshone south and westward. Some of them moved as far south as Texas, emerging as the Comanche by 1700.

==== Arrival of horses ====
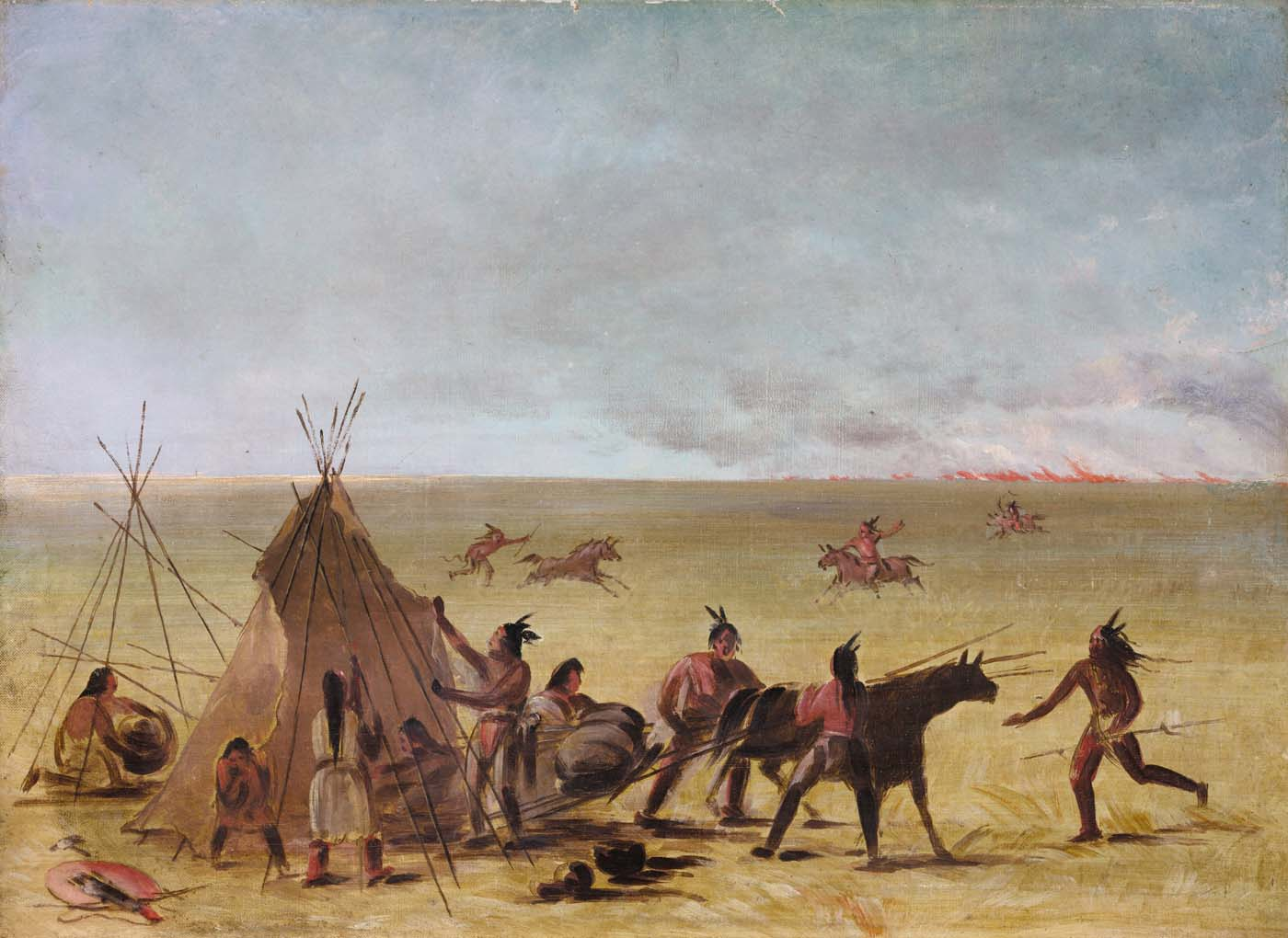
Indian family alarmed at the approach of a prairie fire, George Catlin, c. 1846

The first known contact between Europeans and Indians in the Great Plains occurred in what is now Texas, Kansas, and Nebraska from 1540 to 1542 with the arrival of Francisco Vázquez de Coronado, a Spanish conquistador. In that same period, Hernando de Soto crossed a west-northwest direction in what is now Oklahoma and Texas which is now known as the De Soto Trail. The Spanish thought that the Great Plains were the location of the mythological Quivira and Cíbola, a place said to be rich in gold.

People in the southwest began to acquire horses in the 16th century by trading or stealing them from Spanish colonists in New Mexico. As horse culture moved northward, the Comanche were among the first to commit to a fully mounted nomadic lifestyle. This occurred by the 1730s, when they had acquired enough horses to put all their people on horseback.

The real beginning of the horse culture of the plains began with the Pueblo Revolt of 1680 in New Mexico and the capture of thousands of horses and other livestock. In 1683 a Spanish expedition into Texas found horses among Native people. In 1690, a few horses were found by the Spanish among the Indians living at the mouth of the Colorado River of Texas and the Caddo of eastern Texas had a sizeable number.

The French explorer Claude Charles Du Tisne found 300 horses among the Wichita on the Verdigris River in 1719, but they were still not plentiful. Another Frenchman, Bourgmont, could only buy seven at a high price from the Kaw in 1724, indicating that horses were still scarce among tribes in Kansas. By 1770, that Plains Indians culture was mature, consisting of mounted buffalo-hunting nomads from Saskatchewan and Alberta southward nearly to the Rio Grande.

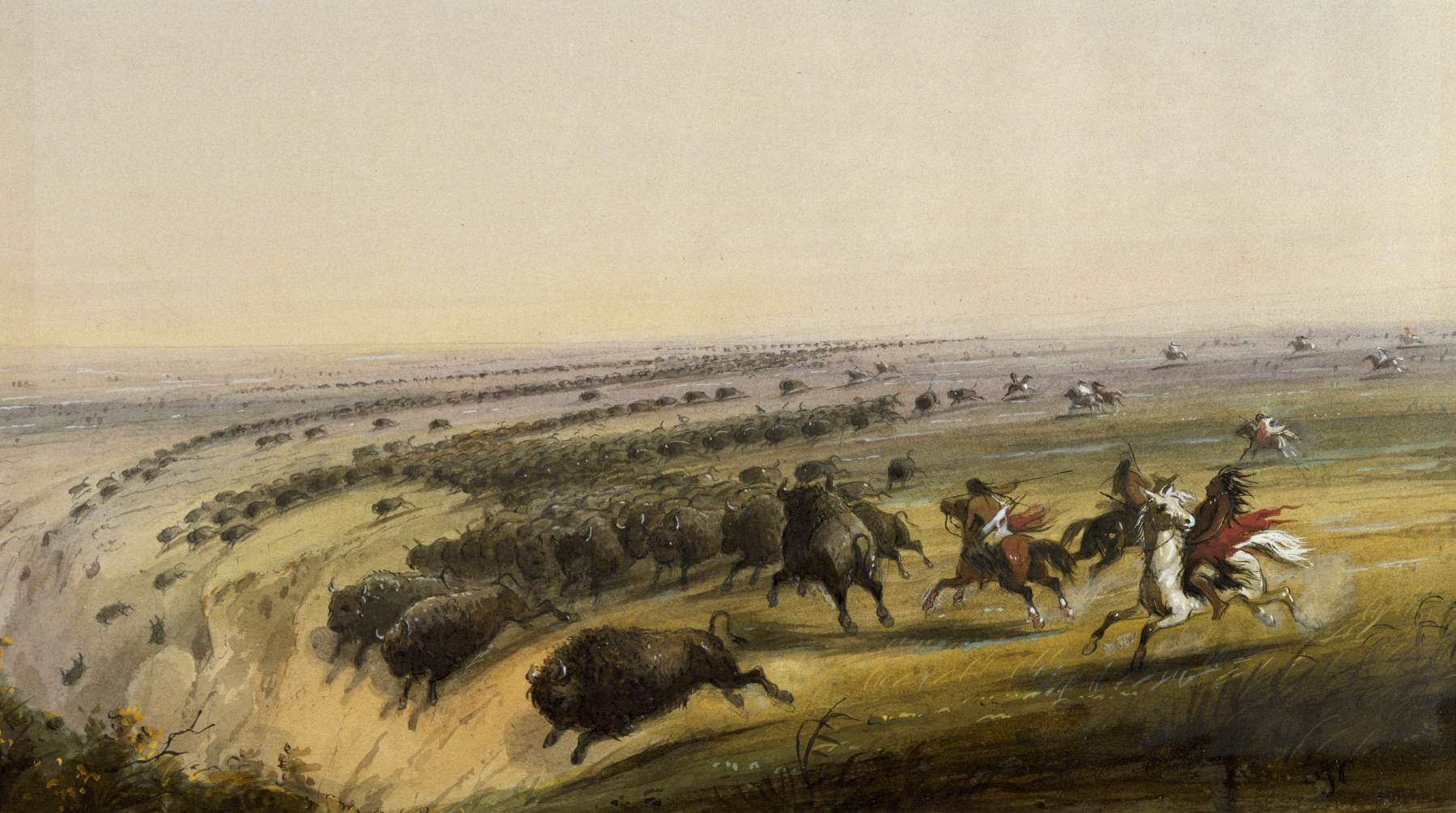
This painting by Alfred Jacob Miller is a portrayal of Plains Indians chasing buffalo over a small cliff. The Walters Art Museum.

The milder winters of the southern Plains favored a pastoral economy by the Indians. On the northeastern Plains of Canada, the Indians were less favored, with families owning fewer horses, remaining more dependent upon dogs for transporting goods, and hunting bison on foot. The scarcity of horses in the north encouraged raiding and warfare in competition for the relatively small number of horses that survived the severe winters.

Comanche power peaked in the 1840s when they conducted large-scale raids hundreds of miles into Mexico proper, while also warring against the Anglo-Americans and Tejanos who had settled in independent Texas.

==== Fur trade ====
The fur trade brought thousands of colonial settlers into the Great Plains over the next 100 years. Fur trappers made their way across much of the region, making regular contacts with Indians.

The Hudson's Bay Company (HBC) had first been granted in 1670 a commercial monopoly over the huge Hudson Bay drainage area known as Rupert's Land covering a northern portion of the Great Plains. The North West Company fur trade incumbent had also been present in the area until acquired by the HBC during the early 1820s.

The United States acquired the Louisiana Purchase in 1803 and conducted the Lewis and Clark Expedition in 1804–1806. More information became available concerning the Plains, and various pioneers entered the areas. Fur trading posts were often the basis of later settlements. Through the 19th century, more settlers migrated to the Great Plains as part of a vast westward expansion of population, and new settlements became dotted across the Great Plains.

The settlers also brought diseases against which the Indians had no resistance. Between a half and two-thirds of the Plains Indians are thought to have died of smallpox by the time of the Louisiana Purchase. The 1837 Great Plains smallpox epidemic spread across the Great Plains, killing many thousands between 1837 and 1840. In the end, it is estimated that two-thirds of the Blackfoot population died, along with half of the Assiniboines and Arikaras, a third of the Crows, and a quarter of the Pawnees.

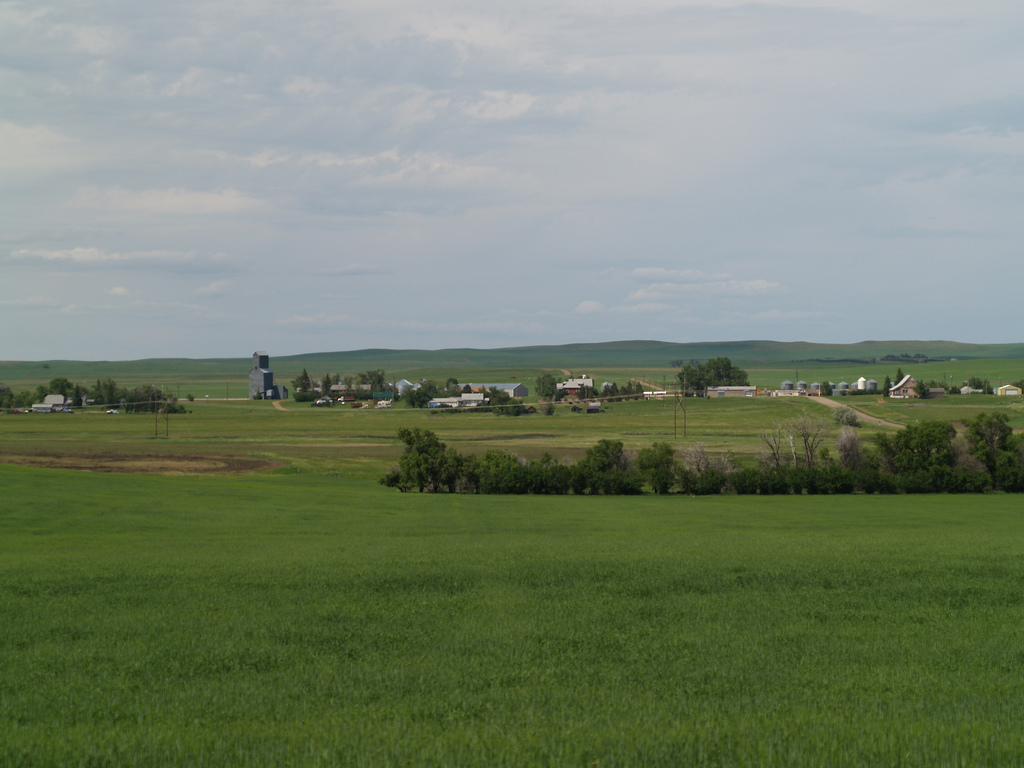
Great Plains in North Dakota c. 2007, where communities began settling in the 1870s.

== Cattle ranching and homesteads ==
Beginning in 1821, the Santa Fe Trail ran from the Missouri River to New Mexico, skirting north of Comancheria. Beginning in the 1830s, the Oregon Trail led from the Missouri River across the Great Plains.

Much of the Great Plains became open range where cattle roamed free, hosting ranching operations where anyone was free to run cattle. In the spring and fall, ranchers held roundups where their cowboys branded new calves, treated animals, and sorted the cattle for sale. Such ranching began in Texas and gradually moved northward. Between 1866 and 1895, cowboys herded 10 million cattle north to rail heads such as Dodge City, Kansas and Ogallala, Nebraska; from there, cattle were shipped east.

Passage of the Kansas-Nebraska Act in 1854 opened both territories to White settlement. The Homestead Acts of 1862 further encouraged settlement and agricultural development in the Great Plains; the population of Nebraska, for instance, increased from under 30,000 in 1860 to over one million in 1890. A homesteader was permitted to claim up to 160 acres (65 ha) of land for only a small filing fee, provided that he or she lived on the land for a period of five years and cultivated it. The provisions were expanded under the Kinkaid Act of 1904 to include a homestead of an entire section. Hundreds of thousands of people claimed such homesteads, sometimes building houses out of the very turf of the land. Many of them were not skilled farmers, and failures were frequent. The Canadian Dominion Lands Act of 1871 served a similar function for establishing homesteads on the prairies in Canada.

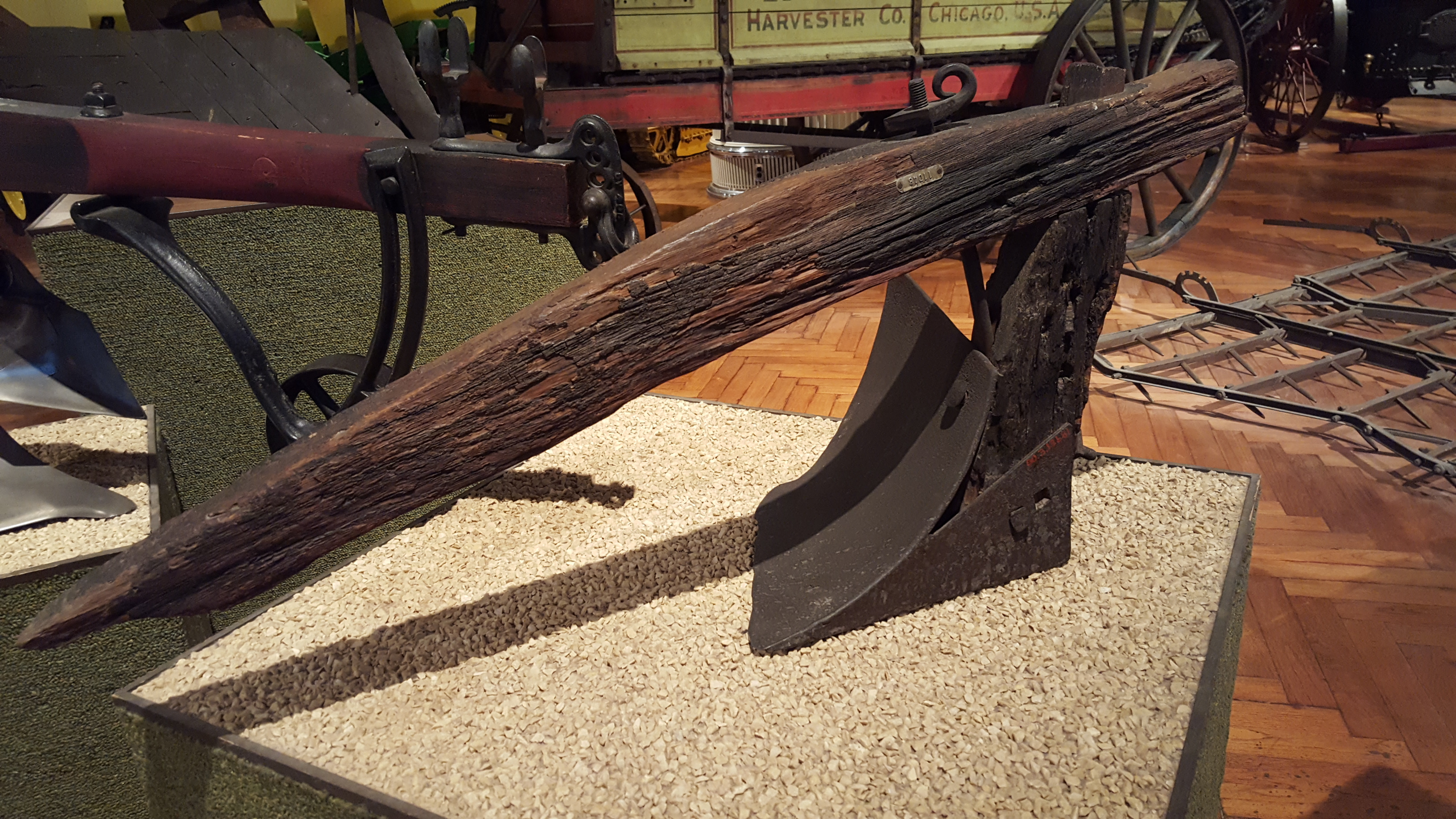
Early John Deere plow, c. 1845, made in Grand Detour, Illinois, displayed at The Henry Ford Museum

== New technology ==
According to historian Walter Prescott Webb, the transition from a nomadic ranching frontier to a settled farming frontier was driven by the Homestead Act of 1862 and six pivotal technologies that allowed settlers to conquer the harsh Great Plains environment. The Colt Six-Shooter provided the military advantage necessary to subdue Plains Indians. Barbed wire (1874) enabled farmers to fence off 160-acre homesteads, protecting crops and isolating purebred livestock, effectively ending the "open range" era. The windmill provided a stationary power source to pump subsurface water, essential for sustaining crops and cattle in an arid climate. The John Deere steel plow, was much better than traditional iron plows. The new steel "self-scouring" plow could cut through the thick, matted sod of the Great Plains without clogging. The railroad brought cattle and crops to market, and brought in immigrants and supplies. It created the infrastructure to transport cattle and monoculture crops (like wheat and corn) to Eastern markets. Finally, advanced machines (including the combine harvester, cultivator and horse-drawn tractor) allowed for large-scale, efficient farming of the level Plains. Together, these innovations transformed the Plains from a nomadic, pastoral region into a sedentary agricultural powerhouse.,

=== Railroads ===
After 1870, the new railroads across the Plains brought hunters who killed off almost all the bison for their hides. The railroads offered attractive packages of land and transportation to American farmers, who rushed to settle the land. They also took advantage of the homestead laws to obtain farms. Land speculators and local boosters identified many potential towns, and those reached by the railroad had a chance, while the others became ghost towns. Towns flourished if they were favored by proximity to the railroad.

The population of Minnesota, Dakota, Nebraska, and Kansas experienced significant growth during the 1870s. The total population in these states grew from 1.0 million in 1870 to 2.4 million in 1880, more than doubling in just 10 years. The number of farms in the region tripled, increasing from 99,000 in 1870 to 302,000 in 1880. The improved acreage (land under cultivation) quintupled, rising from 5.0 million acres to 24.6 million acres during the same period. The new settlers mostly purchased land on generous terms from transcontinental railroads that were given land grants by Washington. They focused on wheat and cattle. This rapid population influx and agricultural expansion was a hallmark of the settlement and development of the Great Plains in the late 19th century, as the region attracted waves of new settlers from Germany, Scandinavia, and Russia, as well as farmers who sold land in older states to move to larger farms.

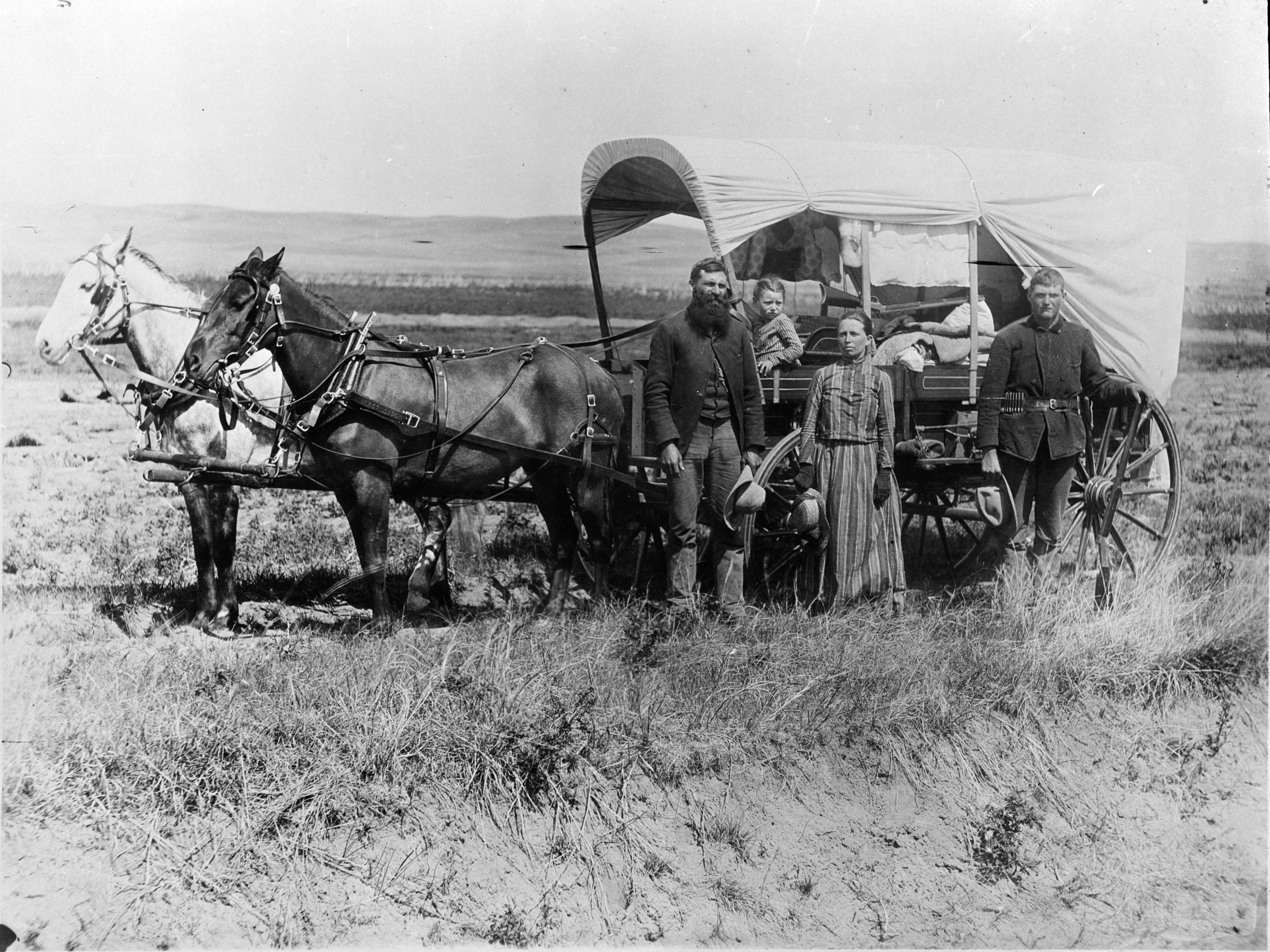
Homesteaders in central Nebraska in 1866

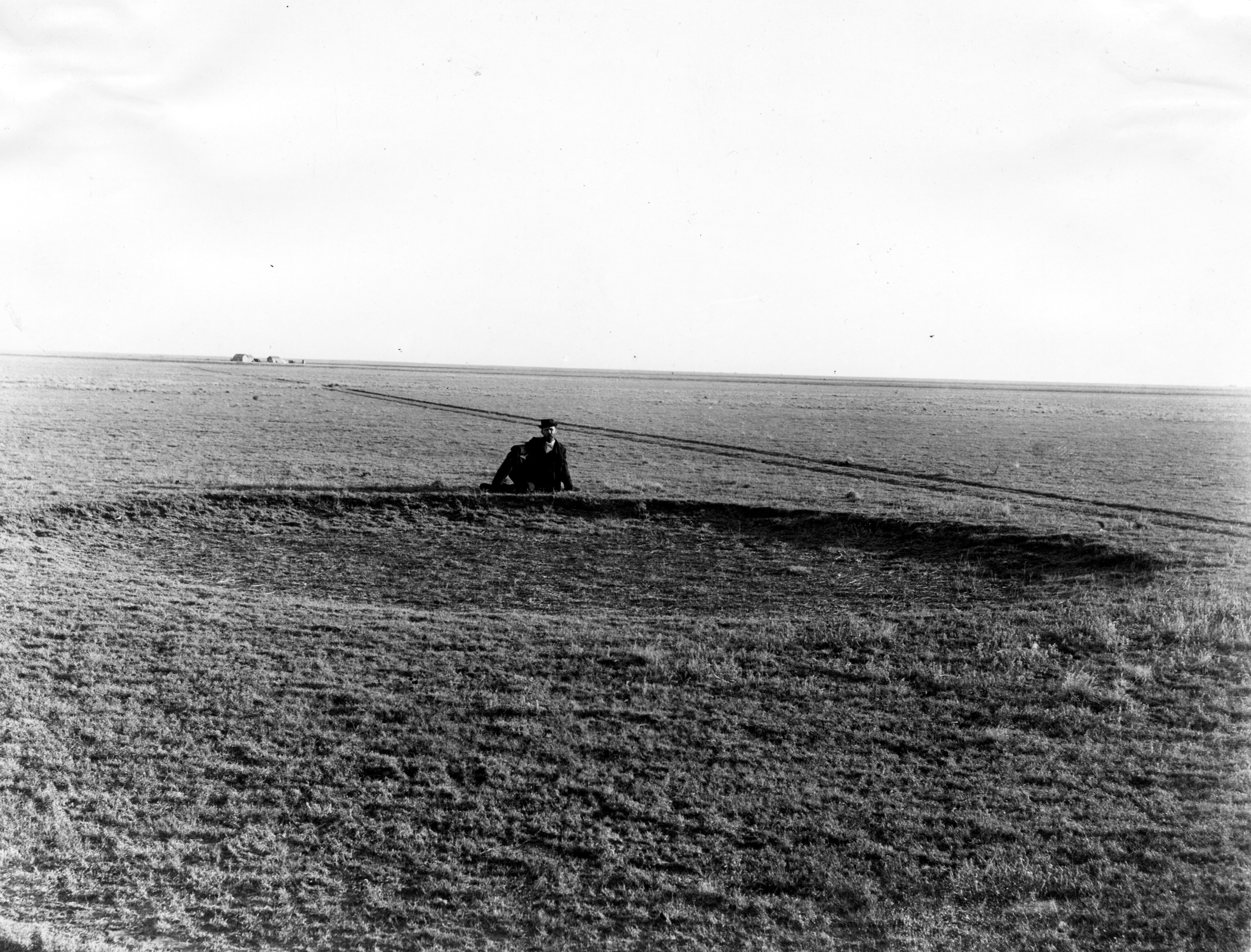
The Great Plains before the native grasses were plowed under, Haskell County, Kansas, 1897, showing a man near a buffalo wallow

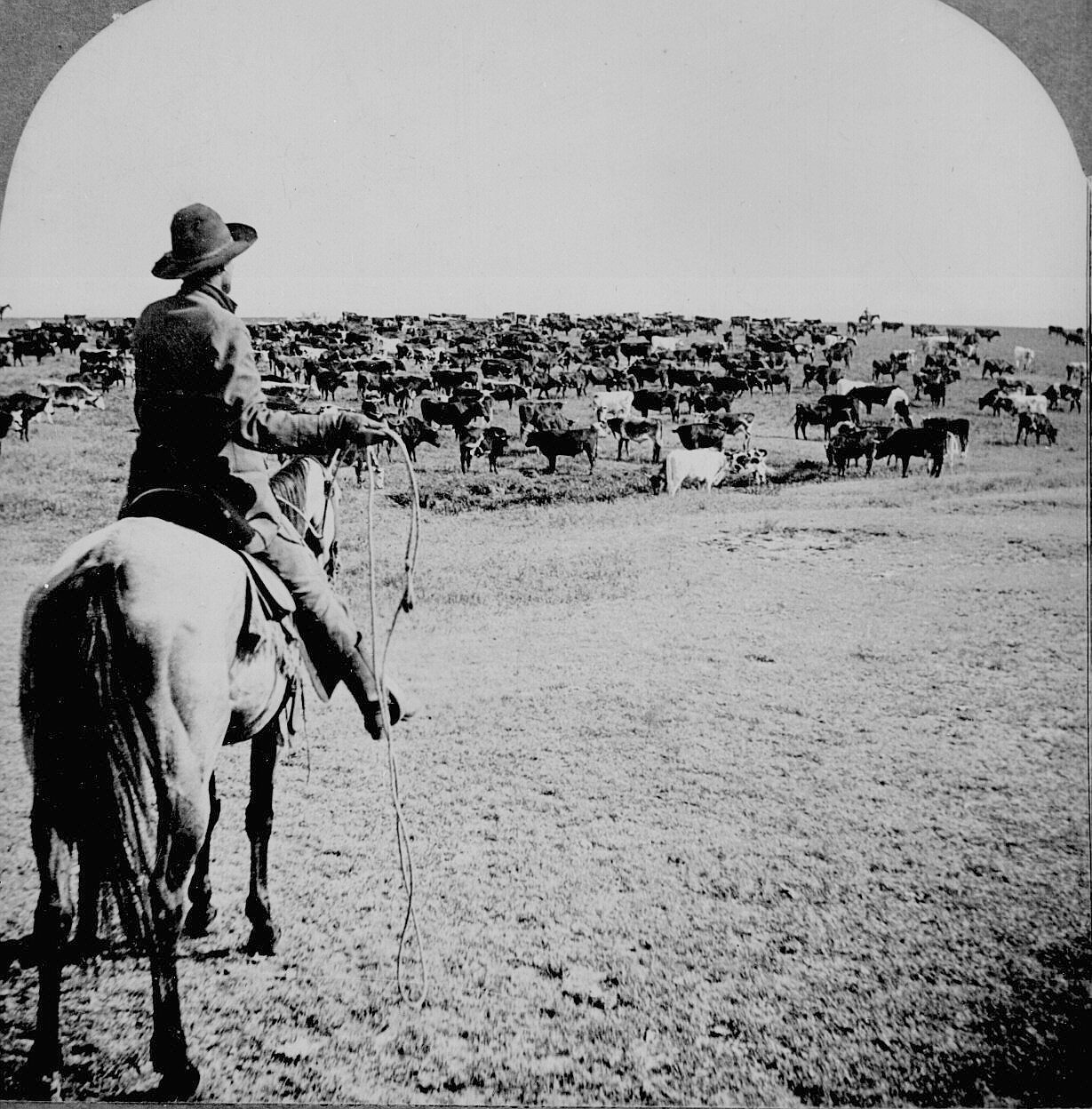
Cattle herd and cowboy, c. 1902

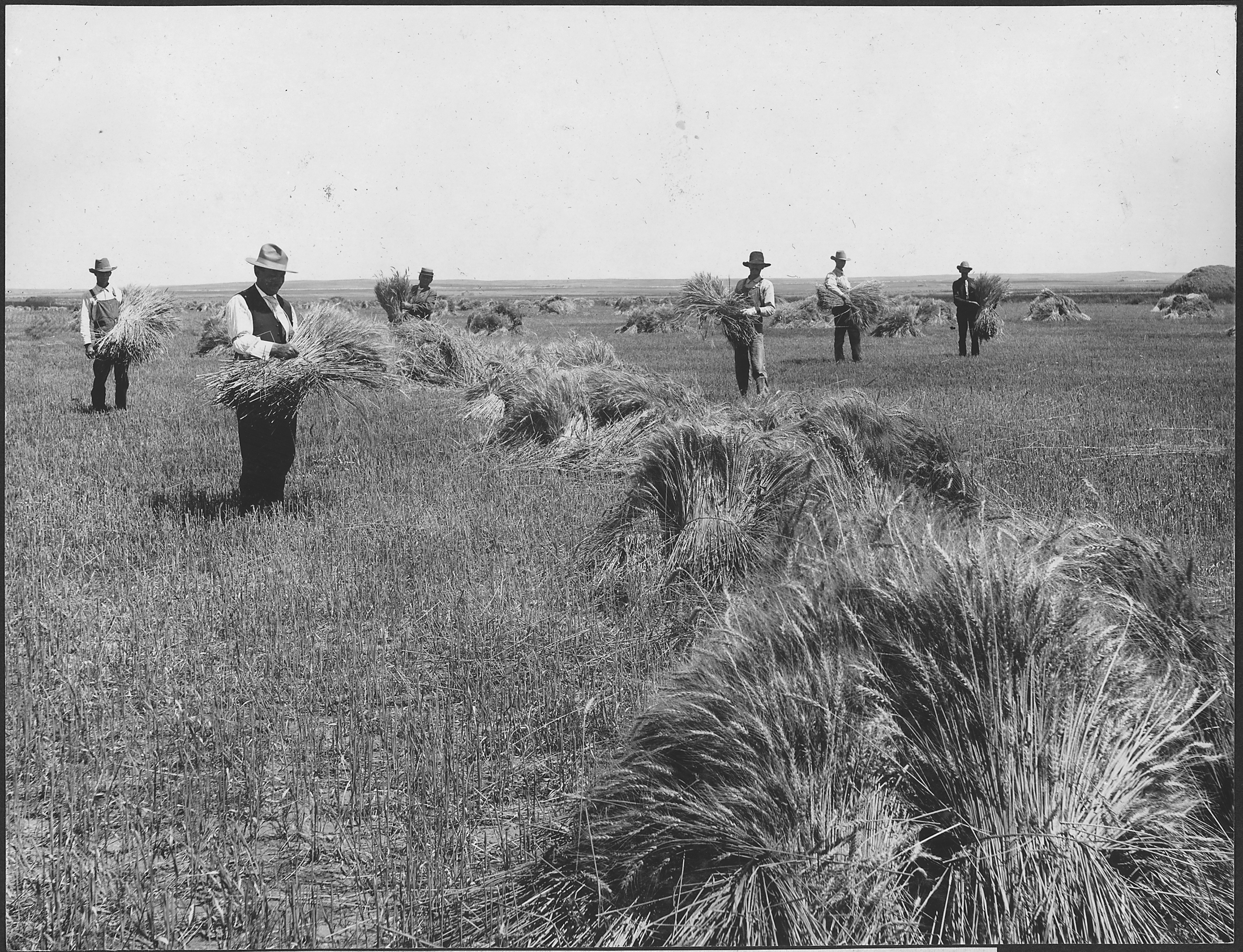
Wheat field on Dutch flats near Mitchell, Nebraska, 1910

=== First White settlements ===
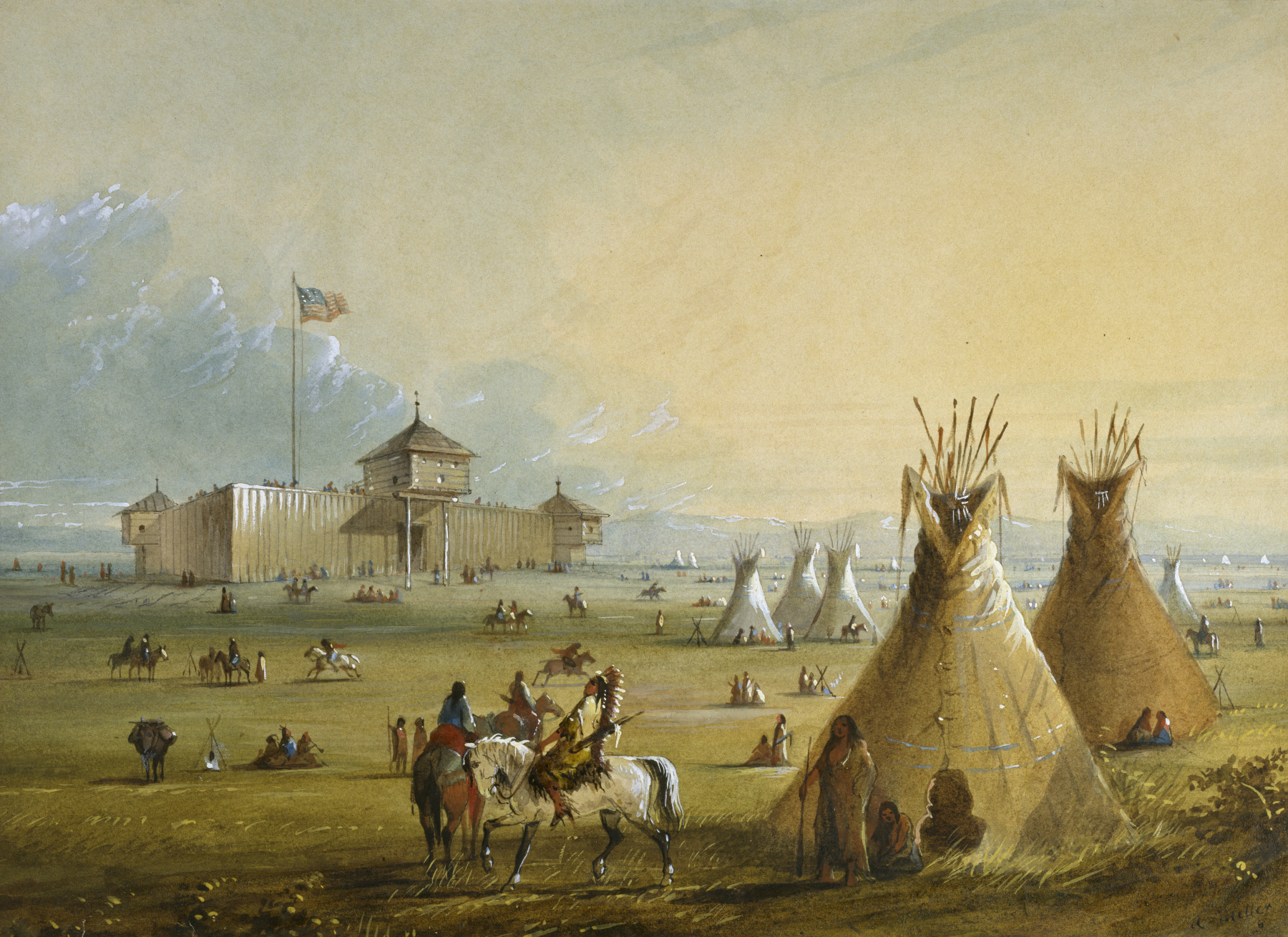
Fort William, the first Fort Laramie, as it looked prior to 1840. Painting from memory by Alfred Jacob Miller

The first White settlements in the Great Plains were forts, particularly along the Santa Fe Trail, and trading posts. Some of the first built were:

- Fort Lisa (1809), North Dakota
- Red River Colony or Selkirk Settlement (1811), Manitoba
- Fort Lisa (1812), Nebraska
- Fort Atkinson (Nebraska) (1819), Nebraska
- Fontenelle's Post (1822), Nebraska
- Cabanne's Trading Post (1822), Nebraska
- Fort Kiowa (1822), South Dakota
- Fort Laramie (1834), Texas
- Fort Parker (1834), Texas
- Zinkenburg (1845), Texas
- Fort Kearney (1848), Nebraska
- Fort Martin Scott (1848), Texas
- Fort Croghan (1849), Texas
- Fort Gates (1849), Texas
- Fort Graham (1849), Texas
- Fort Worth (1849), Texas
- Fort Belknap (1851), Texas
- Fort Mason (1851), Texas
- Fort Chadbourne (1852), Texas
- Fort McKavett (1852), Texas
- Fort Phantom Hill (1852), Texas
- Camp Colorado (1855), Texas
- Fort McPherson (1863), Nebraska
- Fort Mitchell (1864), Nebraska
- Fort Concho (1867), Texas
- Fort Griffin (1867), Texas
- Fort Richardson (1867), Texas
- Fort Sidney (1867), Nebraska
- Fort Omaha (1868), Nebraska
- Fort Hartsuff (1874), Nebraska
- Fort Sill (1869), Oklahoma
- Fort Robinson (1874), Nebraska
- Camp Sheridan (1874), Nebraska
- Fort Niobrara (1880), Nebraska
- Fort Elliott (1875), Texas

=== Social life ===
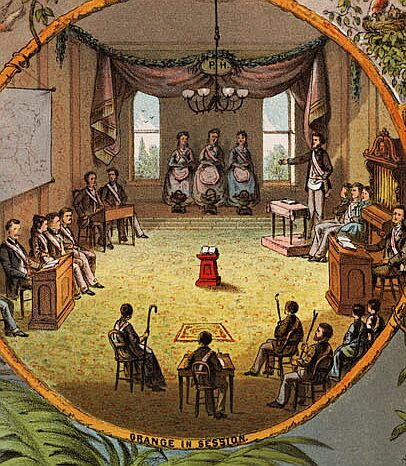
Grange in session, 1873

The railroads opened up the Great Plains for settlement, making it possible to ship wheat and other crops at low cost to the urban markets in the East and overseas. Homestead land was free for American settlers. Railroads sold their land at cheap rates to immigrants in the expectation that they would generate traffic as soon as farms were established. Immigrants poured in, especially from Germany and Scandinavia. On the plains, very few single men attempted to operate a farm or ranch by themselves; they understood the need for a hard-working wife and numerous children to handle the many responsibilities. During the early years of settlement, farm women played an integral role in assuring family survival by working outdoors. After approximately one generation, women increasingly left the fields, thus redefining their roles within the family. New technology encouraged women to turn to domestic roles, including sewing and washing machines. Media and government extension agents promoted the "scientific housekeeping" movement, along with county fairs which featured achievements in home cookery and canning, advice columns for women regarding farm book keeping, and home economics courses in the schools.

The eastern image of farm life in the prairies emphasized the isolation of the lonely farmer and wife, yet plains residents created busy social lives for themselves. They often sponsored activities which combined work, food, and entertainment, such as barn raisings, corn huskings, quilting bees, Grange meetings, church activities and school functions. Women organized shared meals and potluck events, as well as extended visits among families.

== 20th century ==
=== Progressive Era ===
The Progressive movement was a reform movement that took place in all parts of the country during the late 19th and early 20th centuries. The movement sought to address social, political, and economic problems that had arisen as a result of the Industrial Revolution. Progressives believed that the government could play a role in solving these problems by regulating businesses, protecting workers, and providing social welfare programs.

The Plains states were a hotbed of Progressive activity. Many of the reforms that were enacted at the national level were first implemented in the Plains states. For example, the initiative and referendum process, which allows voters to directly enact laws, was first adopted in South Dakota in 1898. The direct primary, which allows voters to choose their party's candidates in primary elections, was first adopted in Wisconsin in 1903.

Progressive reformers in the Great Plains focused on high priority issues, especially:

- Regulation of railroads and public utilities
- Prohibition
- Employer liability and workers' compensation
- Protections for consumers
- State-owned enterprises
- Woman suffrage

Progressives in the Great Plains were more likely to support direct democracy, woman suffrage, and Prohibition than their counterparts elsewhere. They were also more likely to favor state-owned enterprises, especially those devoted to economic development. Plains progressivism was more radical than progressivism in eastern states, with a greater focus on direct democracy, woman suffrage, and Prohibition. Plains progressives were more isolationist regarding foreign policy, largely in response to the large German and Scandinavian elements. Socialists were more active than elsewhere, Progressive reforms had a significant long-term impact on the region. They helped to improve the lives of workers, farmers, and consumers. They also helped to make the Plains states more democratic and responsive to the needs of their citizens.

=== Dust Bowl and water resources ===
Withdrawal rates from the Ogallala Aquifer

The region roughly centered on the Oklahoma Panhandle was known as the Dust Bowl during the late 1920s and early 1930s, including southeastern Colorado, southwestern Kansas, the Texas Panhandle, and extreme northeastern New Mexico. The effects of an extended drought, inappropriate cultivation, and financial crises of the Great Depression forced many farmers off the land throughout the Great Plains.

From the 1950s on, many areas of the Great Plains have become productive crop-growing areas because of extensive irrigation on large land-holdings. The United States is a major exporter of agricultural products. The southern portion of the Great Plains lies over the Ogallala Aquifer, a huge underground layer of water-bearing strata. Center pivot irrigation is used extensively in drier sections of the Great Plains, resulting in aquifer depletion at a rate that is greater than the ground's ability to recharge.

==== Population decline ====
The rural Plains have lost a third of their population since 1920. Several hundred thousand square miles of the Great Plains have fewer than 6 inhabitants per square mile (2.3/km^{2}), the density standard that Frederick Jackson Turner used to declare the American frontier "closed" in 1893. Many have fewer than 2 inhabitants per square mile (0.77/km^{2}). According to Kansas historian Daniel Fitzgerald, there are more than 6,000 ghost towns in Kansas alone. This problem is often exacerbated by the consolidation of farms and the difficulty of attracting modern industry to the region. In addition, the smaller school-age population has forced the consolidation of school districts and the closure of high schools in some communities. The continuing population loss has led some to suggest that the current use of the drier parts of the Great Plains is not sustainable, and there has been a proposal to return approximately 139,000 sq mi (360,000 km^{2}) of these drier parts to native prairie land as a Buffalo Commons.

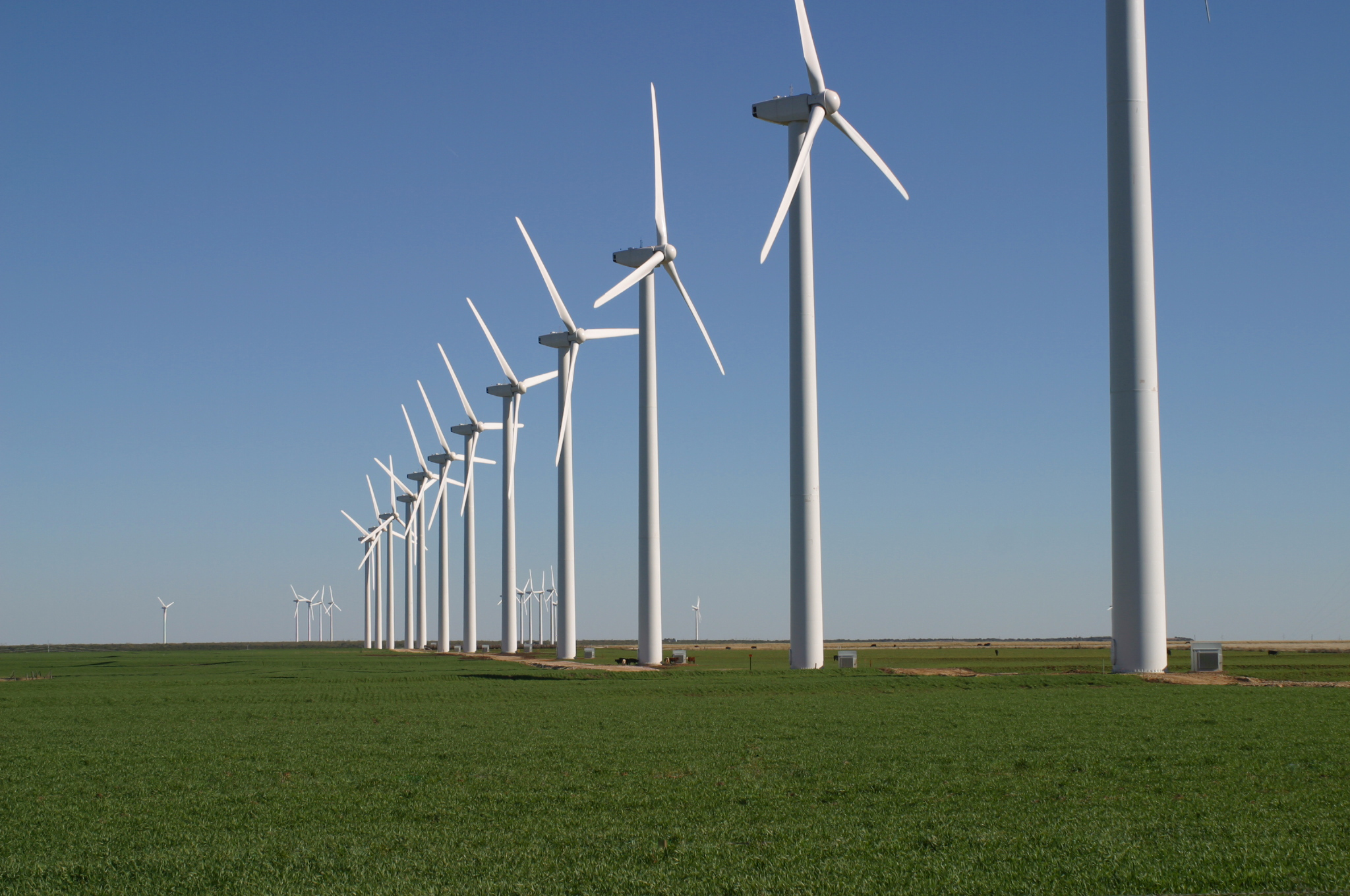
Wind farm in the plains of West Texas

== Wind power ==
The Great Plains contributes substantially to wind power in the United States. T. Boone Pickens developed wind farms after a career as a petroleum executive, and he called for the U.S. to invest $1 trillion to build an additional 200,000 MW of wind power in the Plains as part of his Pickens Plan. He cited Sweetwater, Texas, as an example of economic revitalization driven by wind power development.

== See also ==
- List of online encyclopedias of U.S. states
- 1837 Great Plains smallpox epidemic
- American Prairie (nature reserve)
- Bison hunting
- Dust Bowl
- Great American Desert
- Great bison belt
- Great Plains Art Museum
- Great Plains Conservation Program
- Llano Estacado
- Northern Great Plains History Conference
- Territories of the United States on stamps

=== International steppe-lands ===
- Eurasian Steppe
- Kazakh Steppe
- Pampas, in Argentina, Uruguay, Brazil
- Pontic–Caspian steppe
- Puszta
