= Forts of Texas =

Military installations in the US state

The Forts of Texas include a number of historical and operational military installations. For over 200 years, various groups fought over access to or control over the region that is now Texas. Possession of the region was claimed and disputed by the European powers of Spain and France, and the continental countries of Mexico, the United States, the Republic of Texas, and the Confederate States of America. Ownership of specific lands was claimed and disputed by different ethnic groups, including numerous Native American tribes, Mexican residents, Anglo- and African-American settlers, and European immigrants. Access to and control of resources were claimed and disputed by various economic groups, including indigenous hunter/gatherers, farmers, herders, ranchers, colonists, settlers, buffalo hunters, traders, bandits, smugglers, pirates, and revolutionaries. Over the centuries, claims and disputes were enforced by Native American warriors, Spanish conquistadors, French cavaliers, Texas Rangers, local militias, and uniformed regular army regiments of Spain, Mexico, Texas, the United States, and the Confederacy.

Many military camps, barracks, fortified trading posts, palisades, stockades, blockhouses, strongholds, and fortifications were built to establish, defend, or dispute claims to the area.

== Exploration ==
The region of Texas was claimed by both royal France and imperial Spain. Both European powers mounted expeditions to explore the region of Texas. The Spanish established many missions, while the French built and moved Fort St. Louis many times. A few simple fortifications were established in this era to protect both French and Spanish claims from each other, and to protect expeditionary operations from unwelcoming local inhabitants. Forts in this area at the time include:

- Fort Saint Louis (near Inez)
- Fort St. Louis de Charlotte – originally built by the French, but later rebuilt, garrisoned, and defended by Native Americans (near Spanish Fort)

== Colonization ==
In the 17th and 18th centuries, the primary mechanism for colonization was the Spanish mission. Many such missions included defensive structures to protect their operations and communities. Key missions were supported by nearby Spanish army forts, called presidios.

Missions of this period with historical connections to fortifications or military operations include:

- Mission de Nuestra Señora de la Luz del Orcoquisac (near Wallisville)
- Mission de Nuestra Señora de la Purisima Concepcion (in San Antonio)
- Mission de Nuestra Señora del Espíritu Santo de Zúñiga (near Goliad)
- Mission de Nuestra Señora del Refugio (near Refugio)
- Mission de San Antonio de Valero (in San Antonio)
- Mission de San Francisco de la Espada (in San Antonio)
- Mission de San Francisco de los Tejas (near Grapeland, in Weches)
- Mission de San José y San Miguel de Aguayo (in San Antonio)
- Mission de San Juan Capistrano (in San Antonio)
- Mission de San Lorenzo de la Santa Cruz (near Camp Wood)
- Mission de Señora de los Dolores de los Ais (near San Augustine)

Presidios and forts of this period include:

- Fort Bend (near Richmond)
- Fort Las Casas – James Long's fort on Bolivar Peninsula
- Fort Maison Rouge – Jean Lafitte's pirate fort in Galveston
- Presidio de la Bahía del Espíritu Santo (near Goliad)
- Presidio de la Virgen de los Dolores de los Tejas (near Nacogdoches)
- Presidio de San Antonio de Béjar (in San Antonio)
- Presidio de San Agustín de Ahumada (near Wallisville)
- Presidio de San Elizario (near San Elizario)
- Presidio de San Sabá (near Menard)
- Presidio de San Xavier de Gigedo (near Rockdale)
- Presidio Fuerte de Santa Cruz del Cibolo (near Cestohowa)

== Texas Revolution ==
In the period leading up to the Texas Revolution, Mexico established some new forts in Texas to control or limit Anglo-American immigration into the region. During and shortly following the Revolution, the Texians established a number of forts to defend Texas towns and cities.

Forts of this period include:

- The Alamo – previously Mission de San Antonio de Valero (in San Antonio)
- Dunn's Fort (near Wheelock)
- Fort Anáhuac (near Anahuac)
- Fort Defiance – later known as Fort Goliad – previously Presidio la Bahía (near Goliad)
- Fort Houston (near Palestine, Texas)
- Fort Lipantitlan (near Mathis)
- Presidio de San Antonio de Béjar (in San Antonio)
- Fort Tenoxtitlán (near Cooks Point)
- Fort Terán (near Rockland)
- Fort Travis (near Galveston)
- Fort Velasco (in Surfside Beach)

== Republic of Texas ==
Various fortified settlements were established during the time of the Republic of Texas.

Forts of this period include:

- Fort Bird (near Birdville)

== Mexican–American War ==
Following the annexation of the Republic of Texas by the United States, the US and Mexico did not have a mutual agreement as to the border between Mexico and the new State of Texas. The United States Army established a number of new forts along the border, and military disputes in this area eventually led to the Mexican–American War.

Forts of this period include:

- Fort Brown (in Brownsville)
- Fort Polk (near Port Isabel)
- Fort Sabine (near Sabine)

== Defense from Indians ==
Interference or resistance from local inhabitants was a concern going back to the first explorations by France and Spain. This was especially of concern to Anglo-American settlers in the 19th century as they pushed the frontier ever westward. While Native Americans of coastal regions and East Texas were relatively easily assimilated, displaced, or eliminated, some Native American tribes were more actively resistant. This was most famously true for the Comanche and Apache tribes.

In the 19th century, one of the key organizations for protecting Anglo American settlements was the Texas Rangers. The Rangers operated a number of posts in Texas that were traditionally referred to as forts, though they lacked the kinds of heavy defenses associated with traditional military fortifications.

There were essentially three periods of concern. In the mid 19th century, the US Army was concerned with protecting settlements and towns in eastern, central, and south Texas from Indian interference. During the Civil War, local Texas militias, law enforcement, and civilians were concerned with protecting the entire settled portion of the state from interference from both Indians and Mexican bandits. In the late 19th century, the US Army was concerned with protecting settlements and towns in west Texas from Indians. In the latter period, several Texas forts were garrisoned with units of the US Army's famed Buffalo Soldiers.

Forts of these periods include:

- Fort Belknap (near Newcastle)
- Bent's Fort, also known as Adobe Walls (near Stinnett)
- Fort Bird, also known as Bird's Fort, in Arlington
- Fort Bliss (near El Paso)
- Fort Brown (in Brownsville)
- Fort Chadbourne (Coke County)
- Fort Cibolo (near Shafter)
- Fort Clark (near Brackettville)
- Camp Colorado (in Coleman)
- Fort Concho (in San Angelo)
- Camp Cooper
- Fort Croghan (in Burnet)
- Fort Davis (Jeff Davis County)
- Fort Duncan (near Eagle Pass)
- Fort Elliott (near Mobeetie)
- Fort Ewell (near La Salle County)
- Fort Gates (near Gatesville)
- Fort Graham (under Lake Whitney; partial historical reconstruction near Whitney)
- Fort Griffin (near Albany)
- Fort Hancock (near Fort Hancock)
- Camp Hudson, Fort Hudson (near Bakers Crossing, Texas)
- Fort Inge (near Uvalde)
- Fort Lancaster (near Sheffield)
- Fort Leaton (near Presidio)
- Fort Lincoln (near D'Hanis)
- Fort Martin Scott (near Fredericksburg)
- Fort Mason (Mason County)
- Fort McKavett State Historic Site (Menard County)
- Fort McIntosh (Laredo)
- Fort Merrill (near Dinero)
- Fort Parker (near Groesbeck)
- Fort Phantom Hill (near Abilene)
- Fort Quitman (near McNary)
- Fort Richardson (near Jacksboro)
- Fort Ringgold (in Rio Grande City)
- Sophienburg or Princess Sophia's Fort (in New Braunfels)
- Fort Stockton (in Fort Stockton)
- Fort Terrett (near Roosevelt)
- Fort Worth

Several of the most famous generals from both sides of the American Civil War were stationed at Texas forts while serving in the US Army during this period. Robert E. Lee was stationed at the Alamo and Fort Mason. Albert Sidney Johnston, George Henry Thomas and Earl Van Dorn were also stationed at Fort Mason.

== Civil War ==
Texas forts garrisoned by the US Army were abandoned or surrendered at the start of the American Civil War. Some were re-garrisoned by local Texas forces in order to maintain defenses against Indian incursions. Several camps were opened by the Confederate States Army for recruiting or training.

Only a few forts were specifically garrisoned to be prepared for conflicts between the Confederates and the Union army and navy. These included:

- Fort Caney (near Sargent)
- Fort Esperanza (on Matagorda Island)
- Fort Griffin (near Sabine Pass)
- Fort Grigsby (near Port Neches)
- Fort Manhassett (near Sabine City)

Additionally, there were extensive earthwork fortifications and batteries defending Galveston, which changed hands several times during the war.

== World War I ==
Prior to World War I, revolutions in Mexico led to unrest along the US border, including Mexican raids on towns in the Southwest United States. This led to garrisoning by the US Army of camps and forts all along the Rio Grande, Texas' border with Mexico.

Forts of this period include:

- Fort Bliss (near El Paso)
- Fort Brown (in Brownsville)
- Fort Clark (near Brackettville)
- Fort Crockett (in Galveston)
- Fort Duncan (near Eagle Pass)
- Fort Holland (near Valentine)
- Fort McIntosh (near Laredo)
- Fort Ringgold (in Rio Grande City)
- Fort D. A. Russell (near Marfa)
- Fort Sam Houston (in San Antonio)
- Fort San Jacinto (in Galveston)
- Camp Travis

Additionally, unfortified coastal artillery stations were established at key points on the Texas coast to prevent U-boats or commerce raiders from approaching Texas ports. This included Freeport, Sabine Pass and San Luis Pass.

== World War II ==
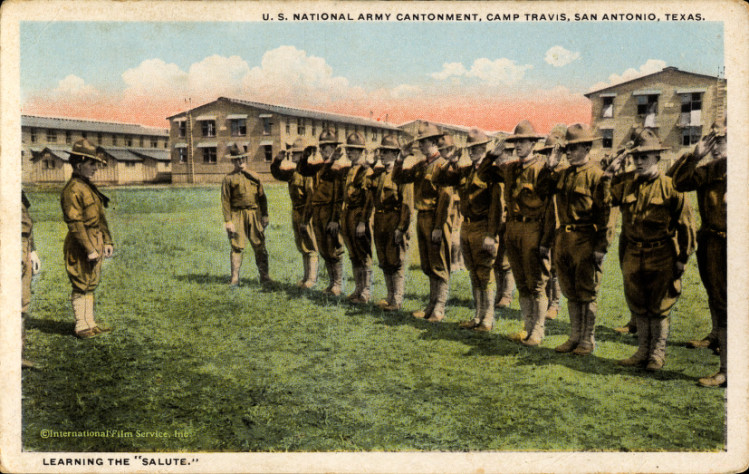
Camp Travis (postcard, circa 1917-1922)

During World War II, the US Army opened or expanded a number of bases and airfields for training. Extensive U-boat activity in the Gulf of Mexico led to concern about naval raids on Texas ports and coastal cities by ships and submarines of the Axis powers.

Forts of this period include:

- Fort Bliss (near El Paso)
- Fort Brown (in Brownsville)
- Fort Clark (near Brackettville)
- Fort Crockett (in Galveston)
- Fort McIntosh (in Laredo)
- Fort Sam Houston (in San Antonio)
- Fort D. A. Russell (near Marfa)
- Fort San Jacinto (in Galveston)
- Fort Travis (on Point Bolivar)

Additionally, unfortified coastal artillery stations were established at key points on the Texas coast to prevent U-boats or aircraft from approaching Texas ports. This included Sabine Pass, Port Arthur, Baytown, Freeport, Port Aransas, Port Isabel, and San Luis Pass. Also, a number of camps for prisoners of war were established.

Camp Travis (previously Camp Wilson) on the northeastern boundary of Fort Sam Houston (five miles northeast of downtown San Antonio). Camp Wilson was renamed Camp Travis after it was chosen as the training site for the Ninetieth Division of the army (Texas-Oklahoma). The Camp Travis training facility covered 18,290 acres (7,400 ha).

== Cold War ==
The emergence of nuclear weapons and a period of comparative tranquility among Texas' inhabitants and neighbors saw the end of conventional fortifications in Texas. However, forts in Texas served as home bases for major US Army units, and also served as important training areas for the US military and her various allies during the Cold War.

Forts of this period include:

- Fort Bliss (near El Paso)
- Fort Hood (near Killeen)
- Fort Sam Houston (in San Antonio)
- Fort Wolters (near Mineral Wells), upgraded from Camp Wolters in 1963. Deactivated in 1973.

== 21st century ==
Fort Bliss and Fort Hood remain the headquarters for major American army units, and both reservations remain important training areas for US and allied forces. Fort Sam Houston remains the home for the Army Medical Department. The US Navy retains two naval air stations as major flying training centers at Corpus Christi and Kingsville and a third naval air station (formerly a major air force base (Carswell AFB)) as a joint reserve base in Fort Worth, and the US Air Force has retained several bases as either active duty installations or via transfer to the Air Force Reserve and Air National Guard. Defense cutbacks have closed a large number of other forts, stations, bases and camps.

Due to the continuing interest in the colorful history of Texas and her people, archaeological exploration of known and recently discovered historic forts continues.
