= Fort Martin Scott =

- U.S. National Register of Historic Places
- Texas State Antiquities Landmark
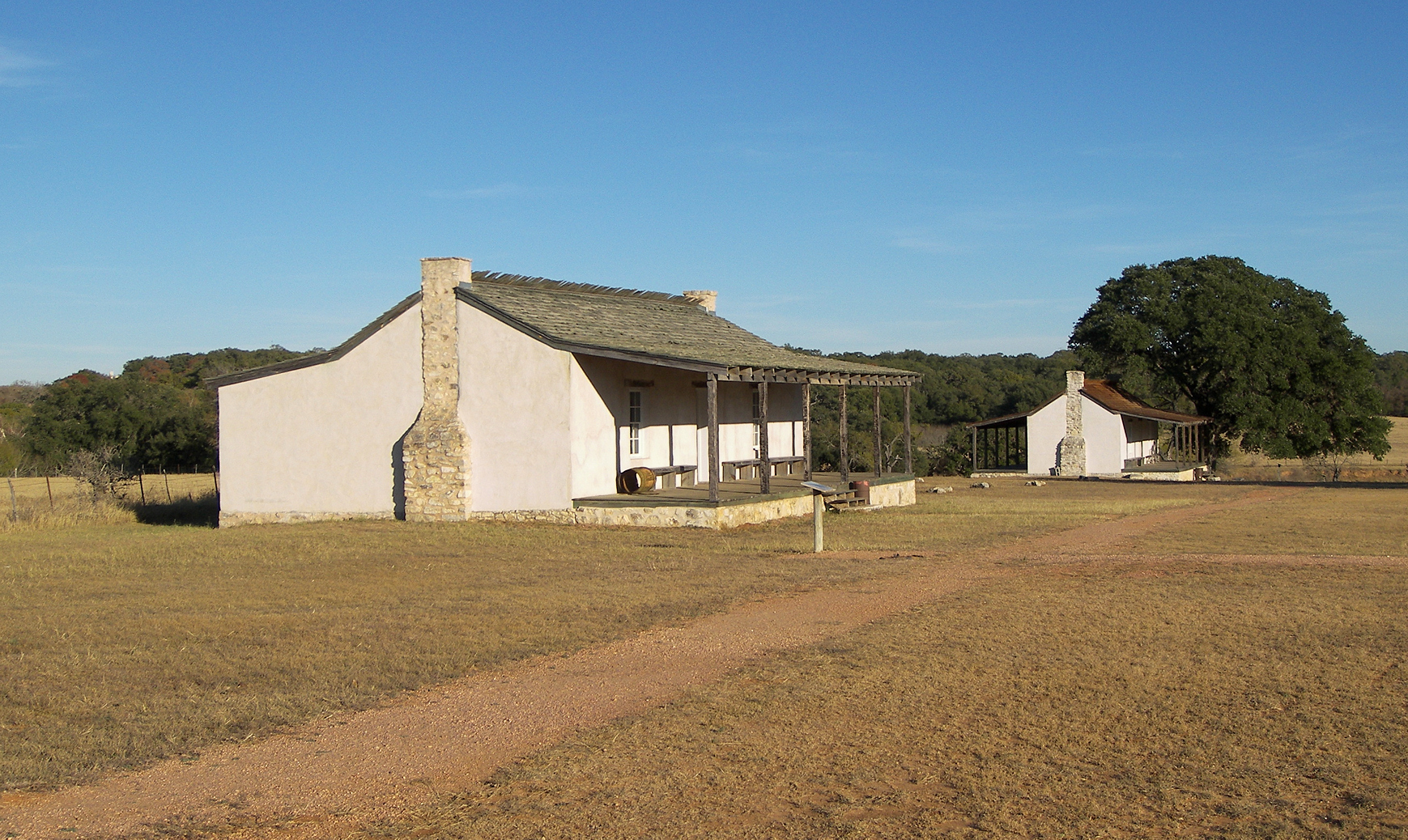
- Restored officer quarters at Fort Martin Scott

- Location within Texas Location within the United States
- Nearest city: Fredericksburg, Texas
- Coordinates: 30°14′58″N 98°50′47″W
- Area: 23 acres (9.3 ha)
- Built: 1847
- NRHP reference No.: 80004121
- TSAL No.: 8200000281

Significant dates
- Added to NRHP: January 20, 1980
- Designated TSAL: January 1, 1988

Fort Martin Scott is a restored United States Army outpost near Fredericksburg in the Texas Hill Country, United States, that was active from December 5, 1848, until April, 1853. It was part of a line of frontier forts established to protect travelers and settlers within Texas.

== Establishment ==
A line of seven army posts was established in 1848–49 after the Mexican War to protect the settlers of West Texas; it included Fort Worth, Fort Graham, Fort Gates, Fort Croghan, Fort Martin Scott, Fort Lincoln, and Fort Duncan.

The fort was originally established as Camp Houston when D Company, 1st Regiment of Infantry commanded by Captain Seth Eastman arrived from Fort Snelling, Minnesota Territory, on December 5, 1848. Company D was ordered to a camp on the Leona, departing in March 1849 and arriving on the 24th. Company I, 8th Regiment of Infantry arrived in the Fredericksburg area on March 8. Whether they met with Company D is unknown. The encampment was then called Camp Chadbourne, and Companies D, F, and K of the 8th Infantry arrived on March 25. Companies D, F, and I departed the area en route to Austin on May 30, leaving K Company in place. The post was then called "Camp near Fredericksburg". On July 17, Company B, 2nd Regiment of Dragoons arrived on site. These two companies shared the post for some time.

The camp was located 2 miles (3 km) southeast of Fredericksburg on Baron's Creek, and eventually consisted of a complex of 21 buildings. The soldiers patrolled the Fredericksburg-San Antonio road and surrounding area. One mission of the outpost was to protect settlers from Indian depredations.

The Eighth Military Department renamed the camp in December 1849 for Major Martin Scott, who was killed at the Battle of Molino del Rey in the Mexican War in 1847. As the settlers pushed farther west, Fort Martin Scott lost its strategic significance. The 2nd Dragoons were ordered to do a major scouting expedition in the spring of 1851. Company B was relieved of duty to Fort Martin Scott on May 1. When the regiment finished the scouting trip, Company B and Company A met and established Fort Mason on the site of present-day Mason, Texas. Company K, 8th Infantry continued to occupy Fort Martin Scott until February 1852. The company left Fort Martin Scott on February 15, along with other 8th Infantry units that had recently arrived. A small detachment was left behind in charge of the public property.

Under the control of the detachment, the site was used for storage, supplies, etc. On January 7, 1853, Company G, 8th Infantry left Ft Chadbourne in charge of animals captured from the Lipan Apache to be delivered to Fort Martin Scott, arriving on January 31. They returned to Fort Chadbourne in March. In 1853, Army inspectors recommended that the fort be closed. The last monthly return for the fort was November 1853. The Eighth Military Department ordered that Fort Martin Scott close in December 1853.

=== Treaties ===
==== Meusebach treaty ====
The full text of this treaty can be found at Meusebach–Comanche Treaty.

On May 9, 1847, prior to the establishment of Fort Martin Scott, an expedition under John O. Meusebach negotiated the nongovernmental Treaty Between the Comanche and the German Immigration Company. The treaty was limited to the specific area between the Llano River and the San Saba River, and only addressed the relations between the Penateka Comanche and the immigrants who came under the aegis of the German Immigration Company.

==== Fort Martin Scott treaty ====
The full text of the treaty can be found at Fort Martin Scott Treaty.

The Fort Martin Scott Treaty was an unratified treaty, negotiated and signed on December 10, 1850, by Indian agent John Rollins, U. S. Army Captain Hamilton W. Merrill, Captain J.B. McGown of the Texas Mounted Volunteers (Texas Rangers), and interpreters John Connor and Jesse Chisholm, as well as 12 Comanche chiefs, six Caddo chiefs, four Lipan chiefs, five Quapaw chiefs, four Tawakoni chiefs, and four Waco chiefs. The treaty was actually signed in San Saba County, but named for the nearest military outpost. On December 25, 1850, General George M. Brooke sent a copy of the treaty to Texas Governor Peter Hansborough Bell, mentioning the treaty had not been approved by the government and was essentially binding only on the part of the Indian tribes.

This treaty put the signed tribes under the sole jurisdiction of the United States of America. It regulated commerce and prohibited supplying alcoholic beverages to the tribes. The tribes were required to remain at peace with each other and the United States government, and to be at peace with other tribes the government deemed at peace. The tribes were to return all stolen property and captives and to cease depredations. The government made it tribal responsibility to report any suspected activity that might violate the treaty, and to assist the government in recovering runaway slaves. In return, the government would establish trading posts and give the tribes blacksmiths and school teachers. The treaty also required the tribes to allow Christian preachers to minister to them, and to allow said preachers unrestrained travel through tribal territory.

== After the infantry years ==
=== Braeutigam family ===
Johann Wolfgang Braeutigam (1829–1884) emigrated with his family from Kaltenlengsfeld, Germany, and arrived at Indianola on Dec 1845. Johann, his wife Christine, and their nine children eventually settled in Fredericksburg. In 1870, the family moved into the abandoned Fort Martin Scott, from which Braeutigam operated a Biergarten. On September 3, 1884, Braeutigam was murdered by four strangers in a robbery of the biergarten's cash box.

== Historical site ==
Fort Martin Scott was designated a Recorded Texas Historic Landmark in 1936, marker number 10039, and added to the National Register of Historic Places in Texas on January 20, 1980. The fort is operated by the city of Fredericksburg and offers self-guided walking tours, pre-scheduled guided tours and school tours. Located at 1606 East Main Street (Highway 290), the site is open Tuesday through Sunday from 10 am to 5 pm.

As of October 8, 2010, the Former Texas Rangers Association was moving forward with a plan approved by the Fredericksburg City Council to build a 41,350-square-foot (3,842 m^{2}) Texas Rangers Heritage Center adjacent to Fort Martin Scott. The plans are for an educational complex that will focus on the heritage of not only the Texas Rangers, but also Fort Martin Scott and Gillespie County. Scheduled ground breaking on the multimillion-dollar center was to be in October 2011.

== Gallery ==
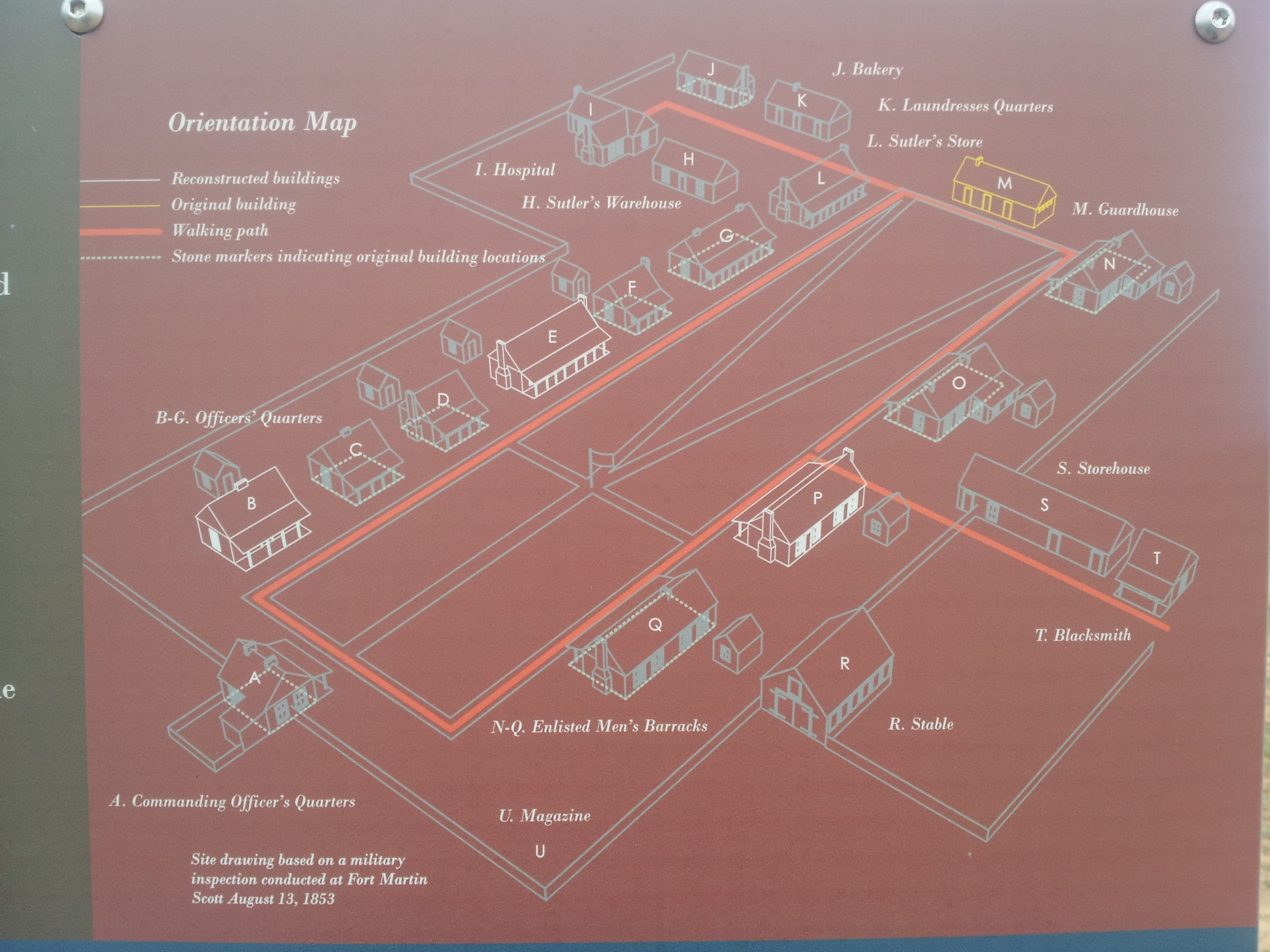
Fort Martin Scott plan

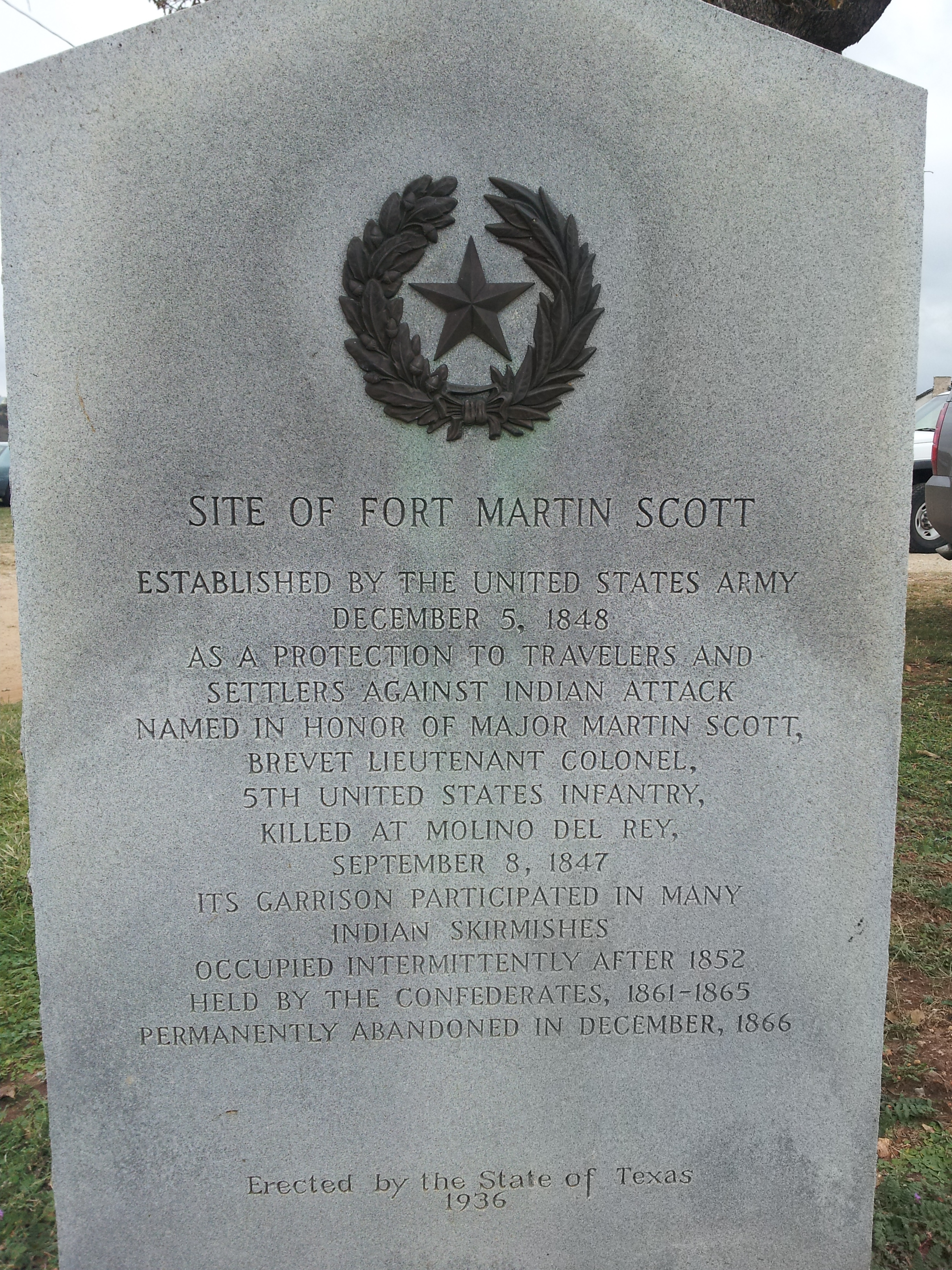
Historical marker

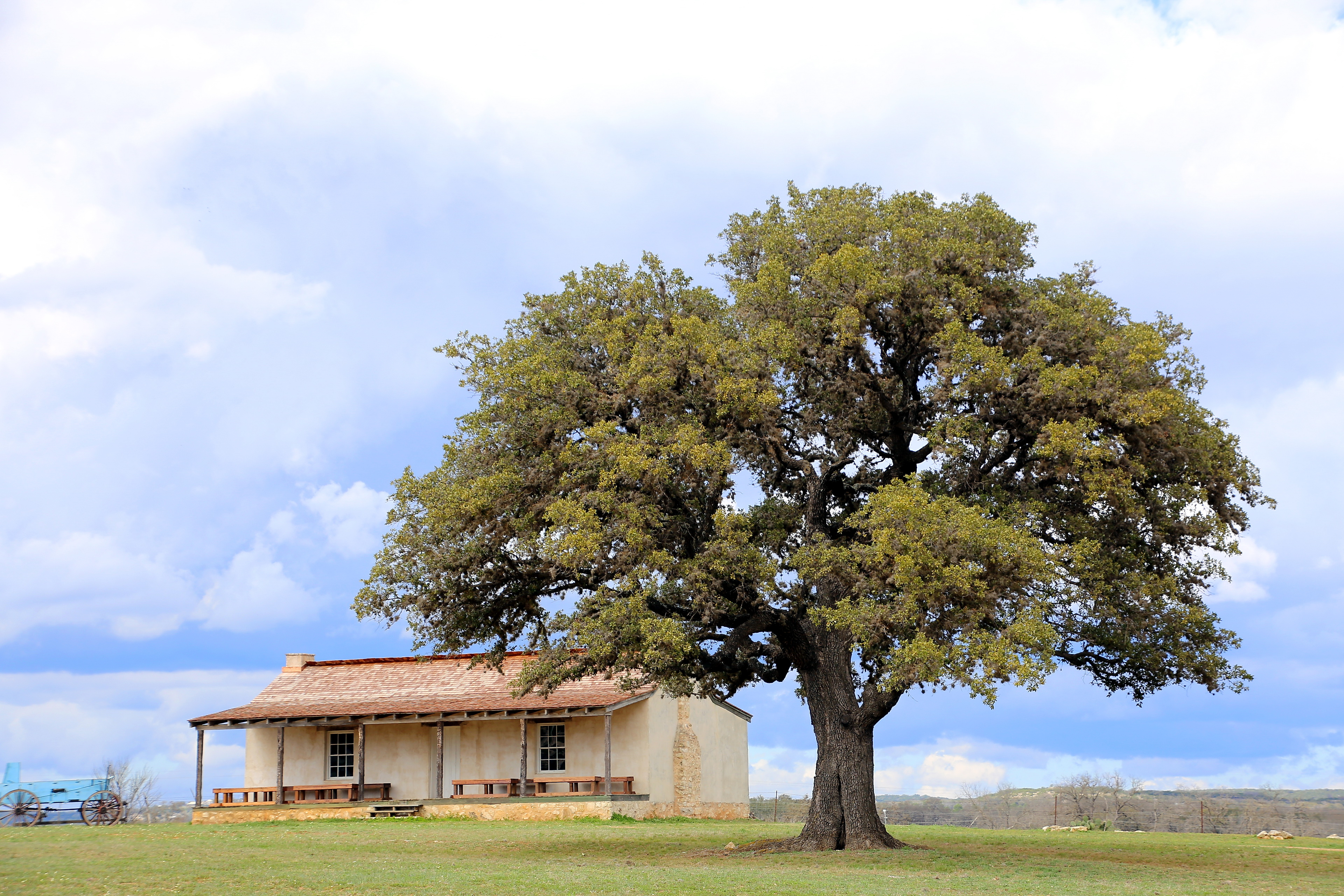
Fort Martin Scott - tree & building (in 2015)

== See also ==
- National Register of Historic Places listings in Gillespie County, Texas
- Forts of Texas
