= Fort Duncan =

- U.S. National Register of Historic Places
- U.S. Historic district
- Texas State Antiquities Landmark
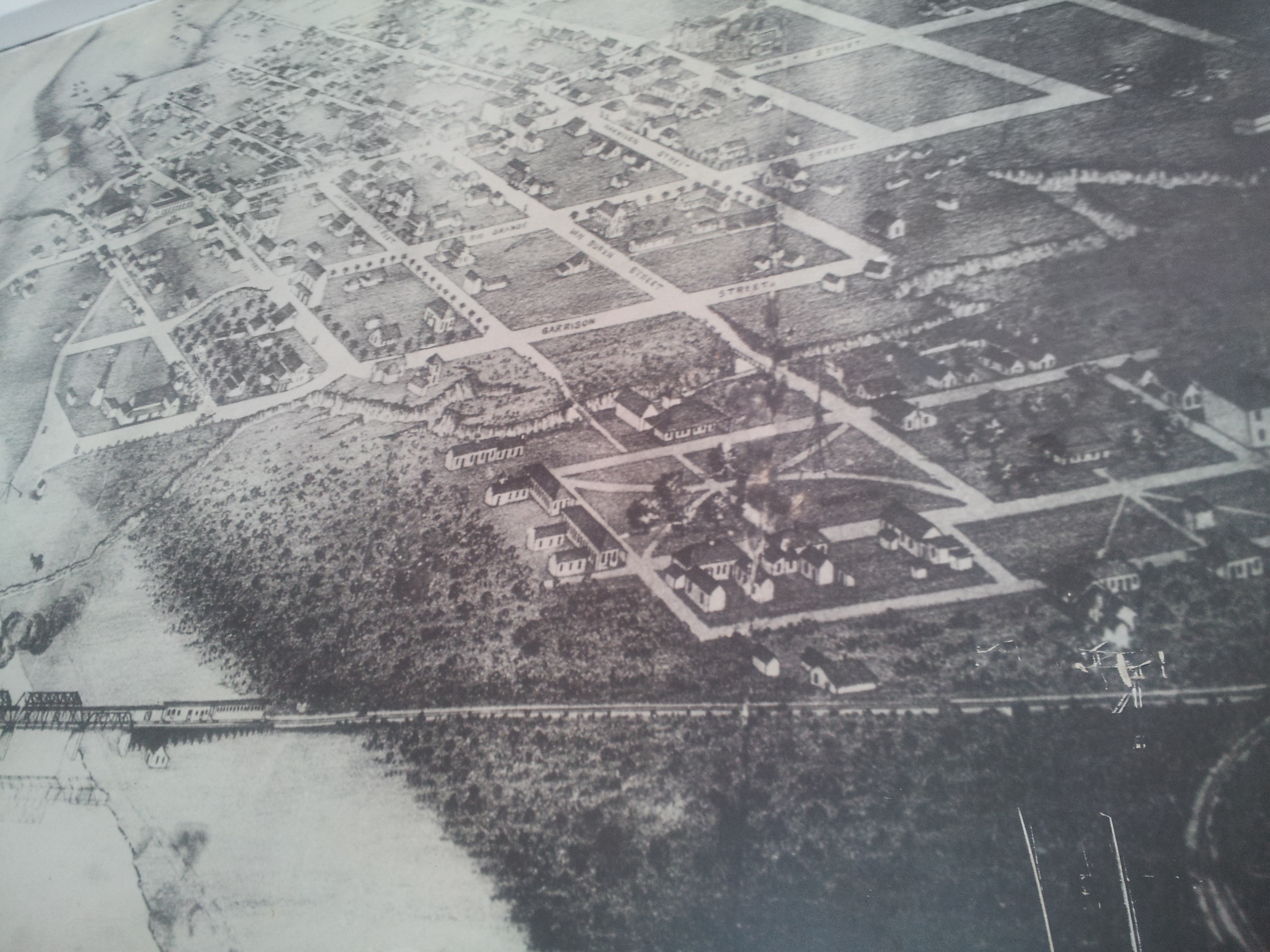
- Fort Duncan 1887

- Location within Texas Location within the United States
- Location: Bounded by Monroe and Garrison Sts,. city limits on the S, and the Rio Grande on the W, Eagle Pass, Texas
- Coordinates: 28°42′7″N 100°30′17″W
- Area: 100 acres (40 ha)
- Built: 1849
- NRHP reference No.: 71000954
- TSAL No.: 460

Significant dates
- Added to NRHP: December 9, 1971
- Designated TSAL: May 28, 1981

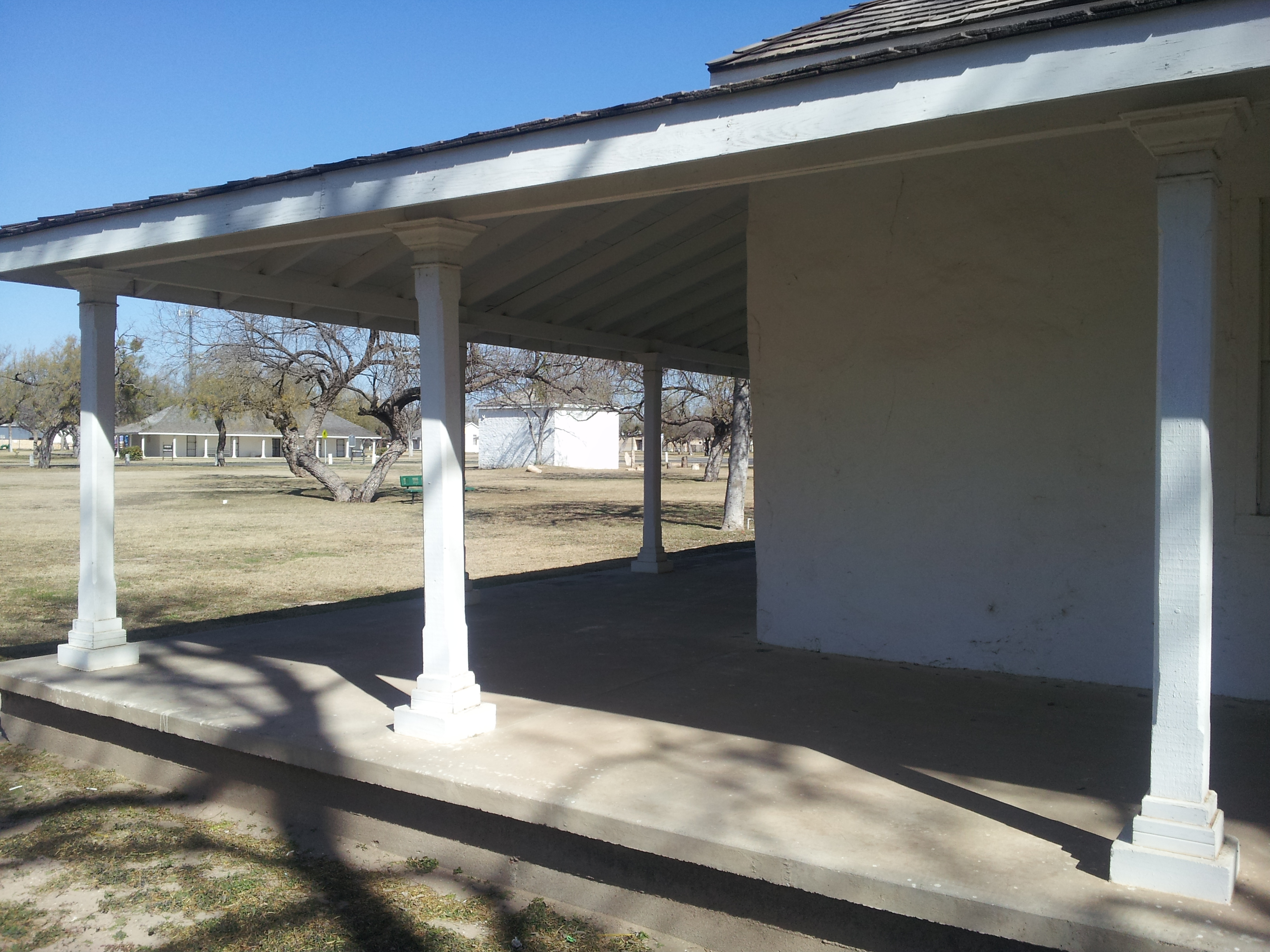
Commanding officer quarters looking towards the magazine and museum

Fort Duncan was a United States Army base, set up to protect the first U.S. settlement on the Rio Grande near the current town of Eagle Pass, Texas.

== History ==
A line of seven army posts was established in 1848–49 after the Mexican War to protect the settlers of West Texas and included Fort Worth, Fort Graham, Fort Gates, Fort Croghan, Fort Martin Scott, Fort Lincoln and Fort Duncan. Fort Duncan was established on March 27, 1849, when Captain Sidney Burbank occupied the site with companies A, B, and F of the First United States Infantry. On November 14, 1849, the post was named Fort Duncan, after Col. James Duncan, a hero of the Mexican–American War.

The post consisted of a storehouse, two magazines, four officers' quarters, and a stone hospital, in addition to quarters for enlisted men. Construction was done half by the troops and half by hired workers. There was ample stone but no timber for building, and the men suffered from exposure. Company C, 1st Regiment of Artillery, asked permission to construct quarters at its own expense. During the 1850s, Fort Duncan provided merchants and traders protection from border frontier outlaws and Native Americans. The fort also served as a post for scouting Native Americans.

In 1854, Lt.s Philip Sheridan, Zenas Bliss, Richard W. Johnson and Assistant Surgeon Albert J. Myer were stationed here, the Lieutenants after graduating from West Point.

Fort Duncan became involved in an invasion of Mexico on 2 October 1855, when Texas Ranger Captain James H. Callahan led an effort to capture "runaway slaves", but confronted by Mexican regular troops, Seminoles and the ex-slaves, Callahan retreated to Piedras Negras, which caught fire, threatening his force with annihilation until Capt. Burbank covered Callahan's retreat across the Rio Grande with Fort Duncan artillery.

Secretary of War John B. Floyd ordered the post abandoned in May 1859, but Lt. Col. Robert E. Lee ordered the fort reoccupied in March 1860 during the Cortina Troubles. The fort at this time consisted of "25 buildings ... nearly all are stone and adobe with thatched roofs."

General David E. Twiggs ordered the fort evacuated on 21 February 1861, just before the outbreak of the American Civil War. However, Major William H. French was able to evacuate three companies of artillery at Fort Duncan and two at Fort Brown to Fort Jefferson and Fort Zachary Taylor in Florida. The CSA garrisoned the fort with volunteers and Texas Rangers, renaming it Rio Grande Station, which became an important port for the export of cotton into Mexico.

Federal troops reoccupied Fort Duncan on 23 March 1868 by the 41st Infantry under the command of Lt. Col. William R. Shafter, and Lt. Henry Ware Lawton as quartermaster. An additional unit of Buffalo soldiers stationed at the fort, besides the 41st, was the 9th Cavalry. This included George B. Jackson, later a businessman in San Angelo called "the wealthiest black man in Texas" during the second half of the 19th century. The 25th Infantry arrived under the command of Major Bliss in 1870, and the Black Seminole Scouts were organized at the fort, initially under the command of 2nd Lt. Henry Field Leggett, but later commanded by 2nd Lt. John L. Bullis.

The post was abandoned once again on 31 August 1883.

== Camp at Eagle Pass ==
Camp at Eagle Pass was established on 3 April 1886 as a sub-post of Fort Clark until it was discontinued in February 1927. The 3rd Texas Volunteer Infantry was based here from 25 May 1898 until 16 February 1899. The camp was ordered abandoned in 1904 but a detachment of Signal Corps was placed here on 9 February 1911 while "Mexico was aflame with revolution" until 1914. The National Guard was mobilized here in 1916, joining the Coast Artillery Corps, while the 90th Aero Squadron operated DH-4Bs from here in 1919 until 1920, which included Jimmy Doolittle. Only a caretaker force remained to watch over the hospital from 1922 until final closure of the camp in 1927.

== Military Aviation ==
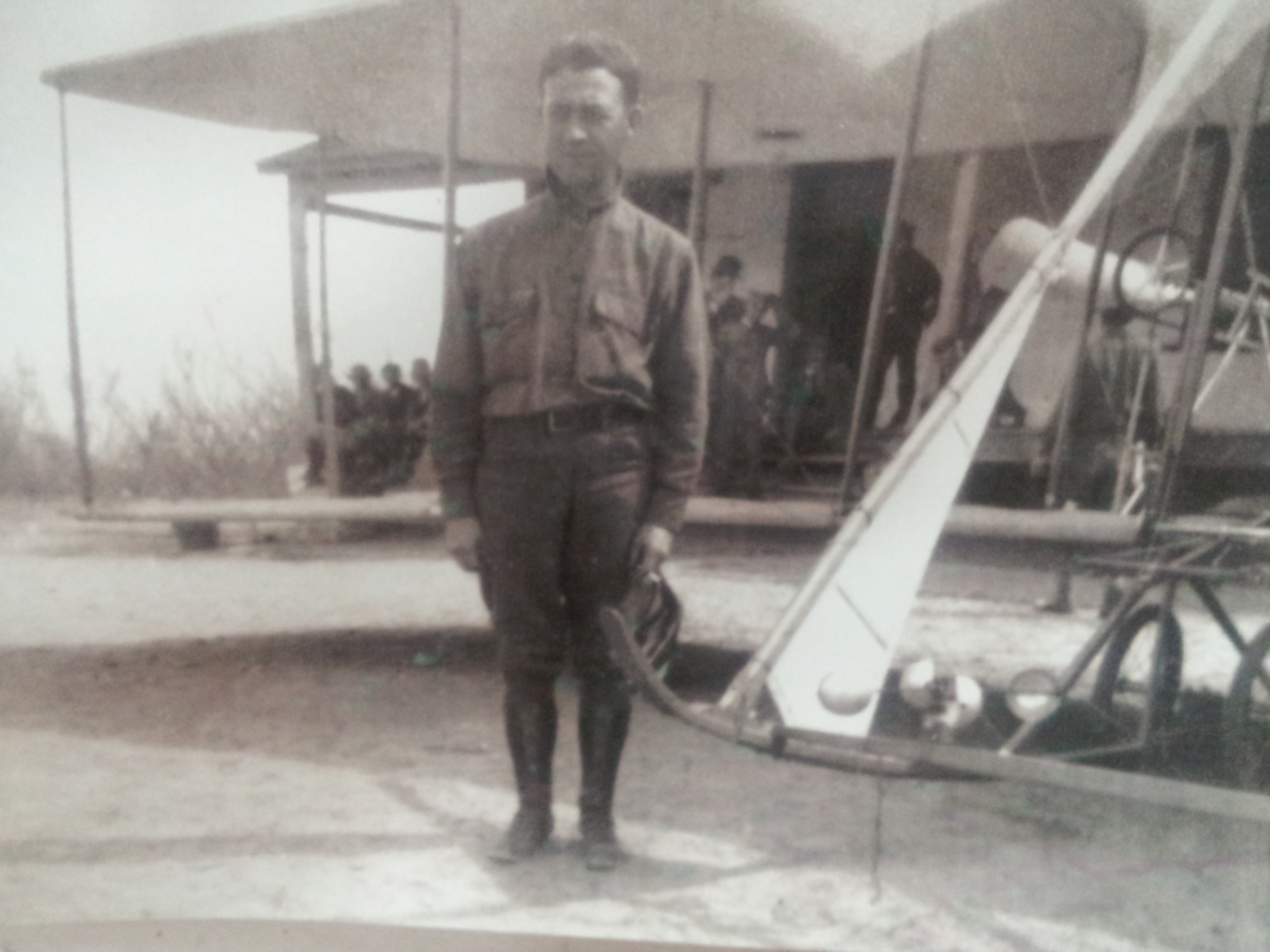
U.S. Army Air Corps Major General Benjamin Foulois

On 3 March 1911, Benjamin Foulois and Philip Orin Parmelee flew the US military's first cross country reconnaissance flight here from Laredo using a Wright Model B covering 106 miles in two hours at an altitude of 800 feet.

== Preservation ==
In 1933, the City of Eagle Pass Parks and Recreation Department began maintaining the old fort as a public park. The city formally acquired the property in 1938 at an auction price of $3760 and converted it into Fort Duncan Park. In 1942 the mayor offered the fort to the military for use during World War II. The government used the Fort Duncan Country Club as an officers' club and the swimming pool for commissioned personnel stationed at Eagle Pass Army Air Field. The site was listed in the National Register of Historic Places in 1971. Seven of the original buildings still stand today. In the early 1980s, the Fort Duncan Country Club caught fire and only the outer walls remain.

The Commander's Headquarters building has been converted into the Fort Duncan Museum, with exhibits of local and fort history and artifacts.

== Gallery ==
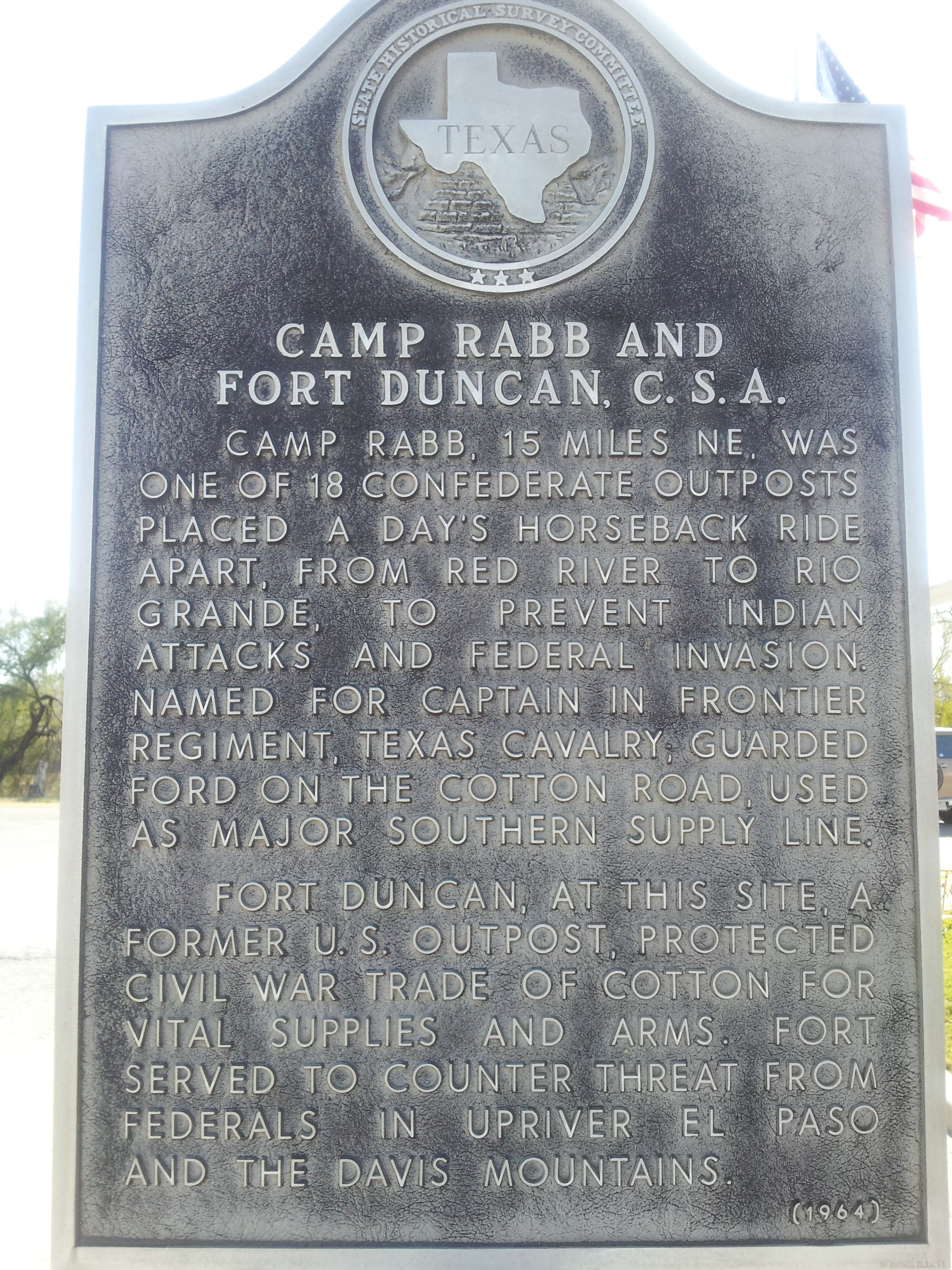
Texas historical marker, CSA

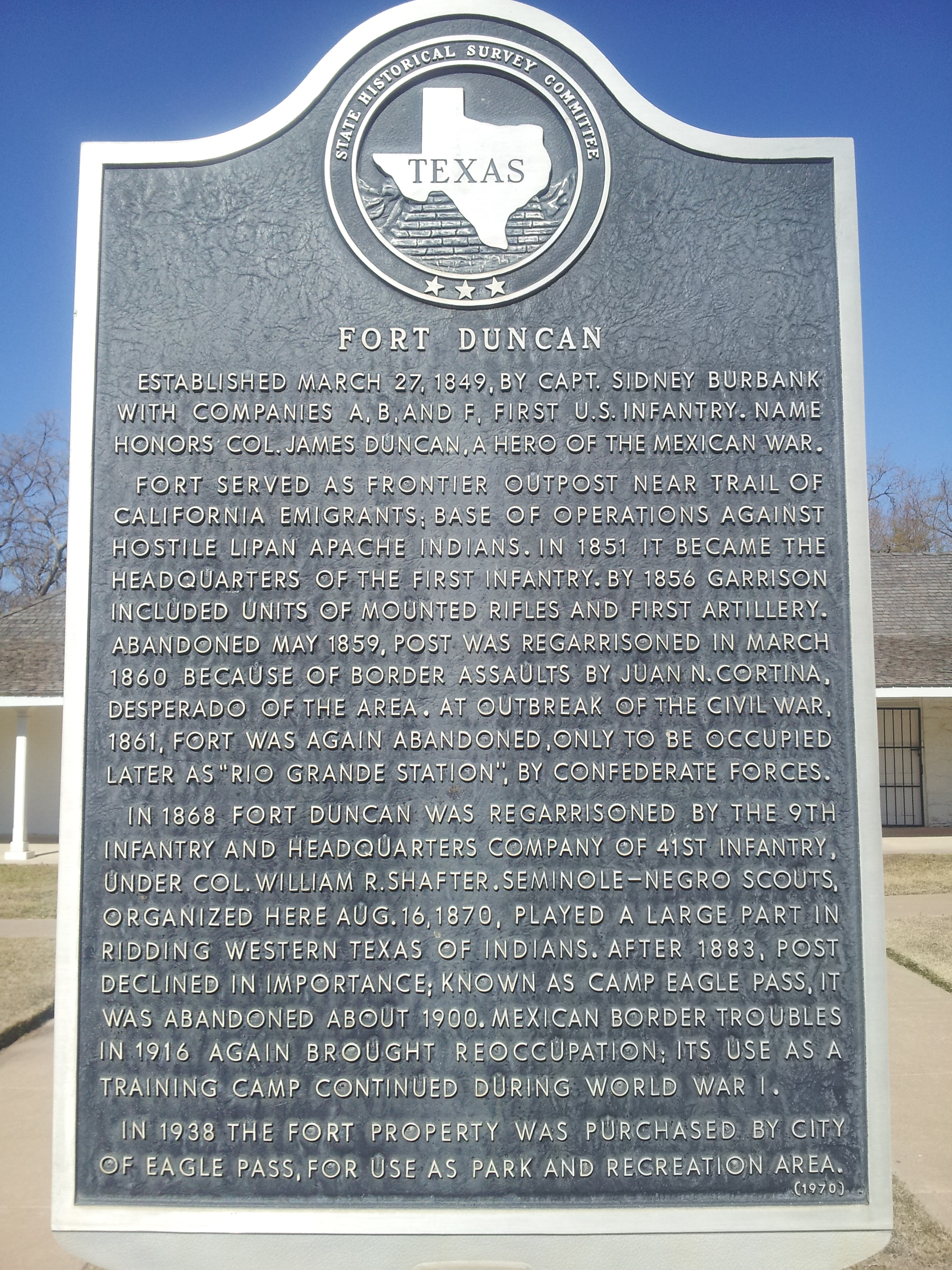
Texas historical marker

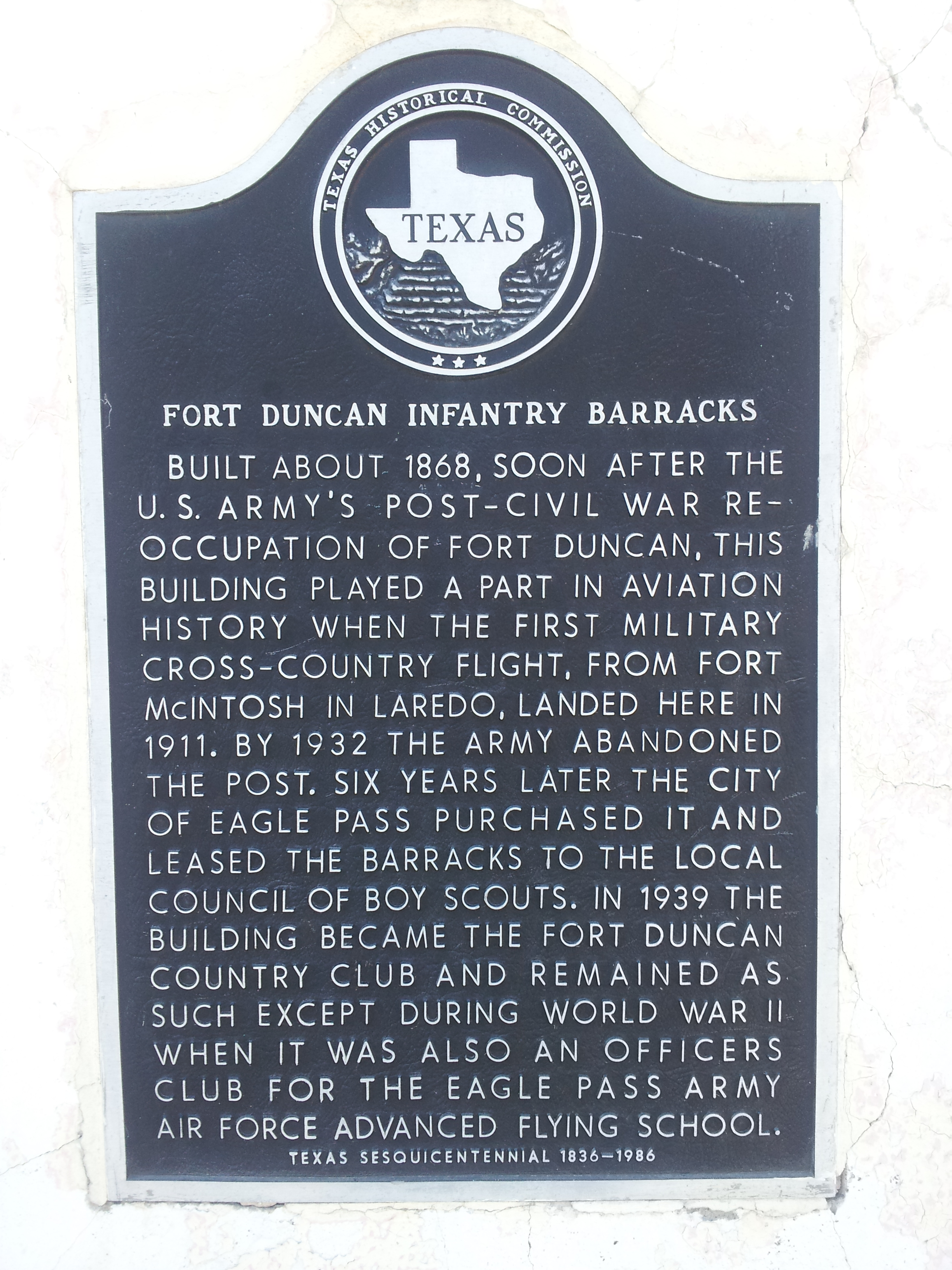
Texas Historical marker for barracks

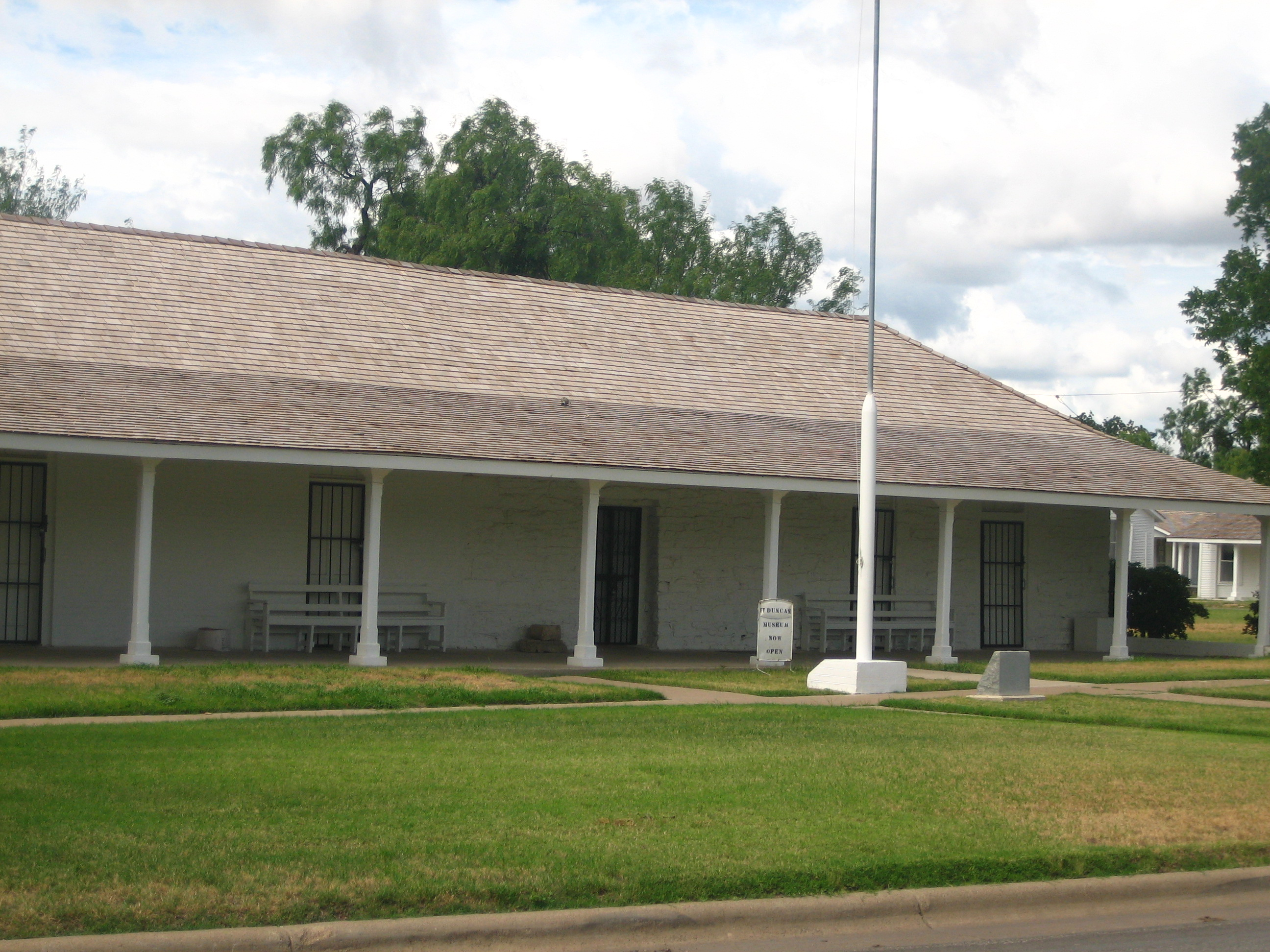
Fort Duncan Headquarter and Museum

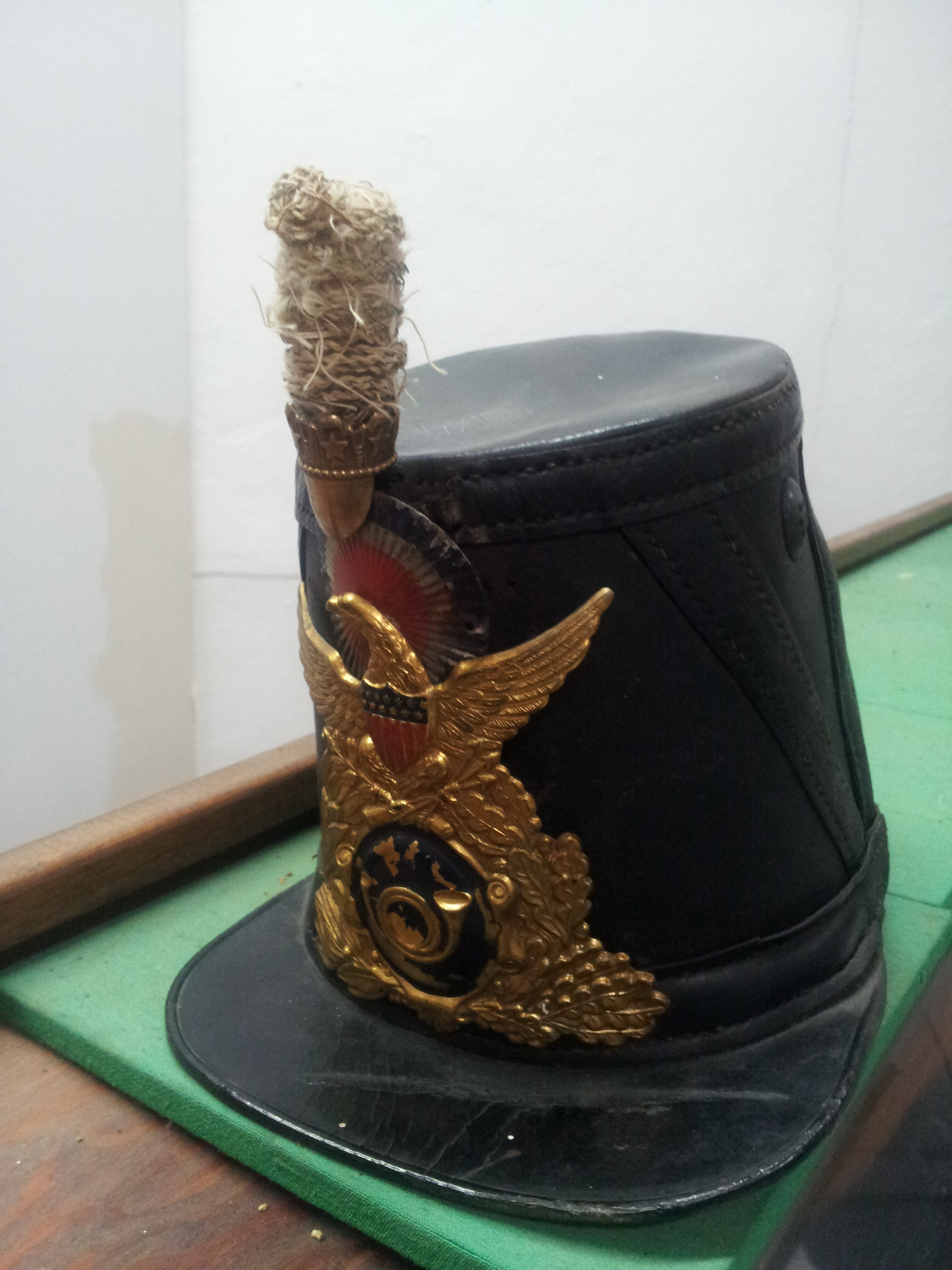
Museum 19th century infantry hat, or shako

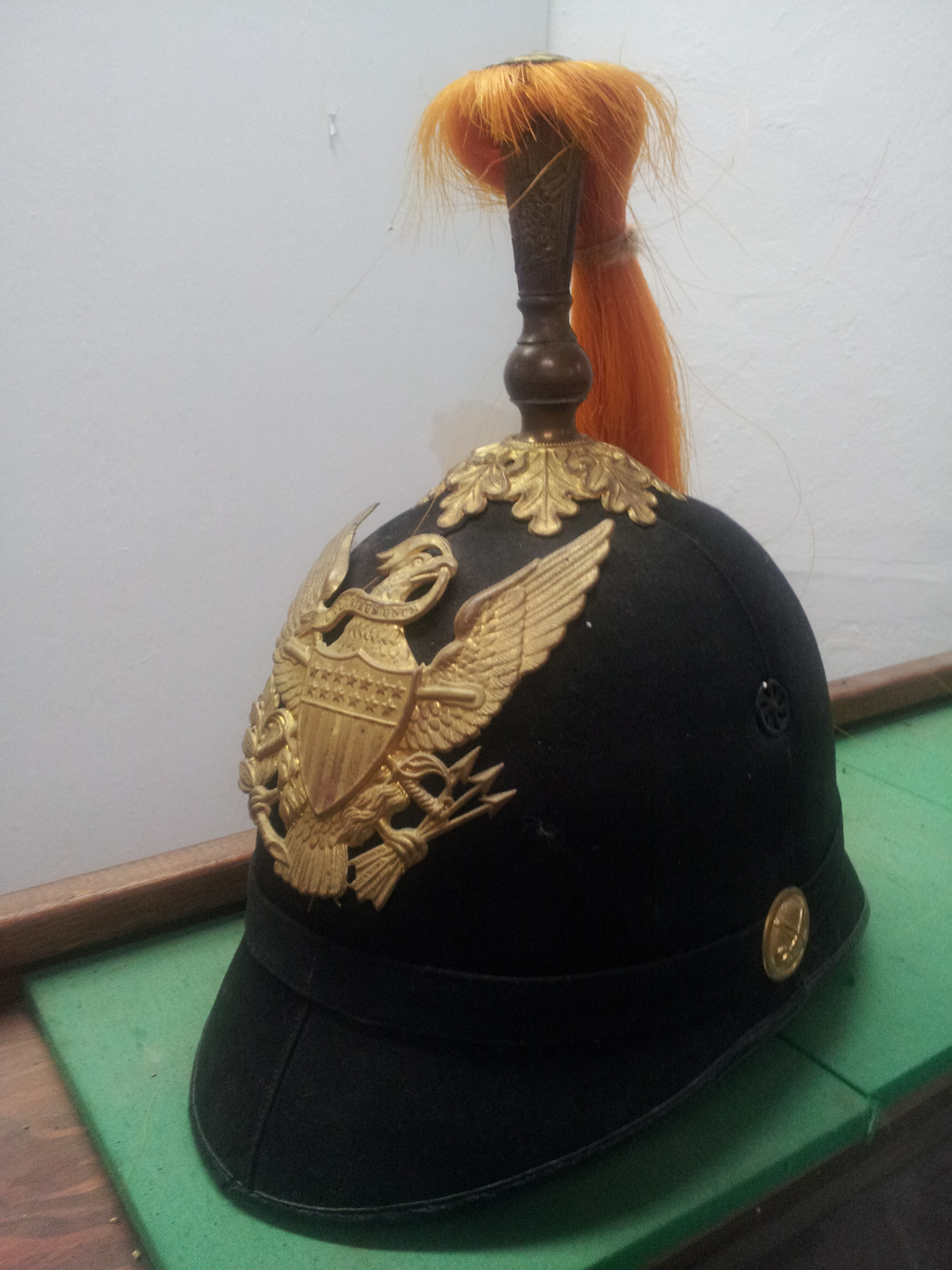
Museum 19th century cavalry hat

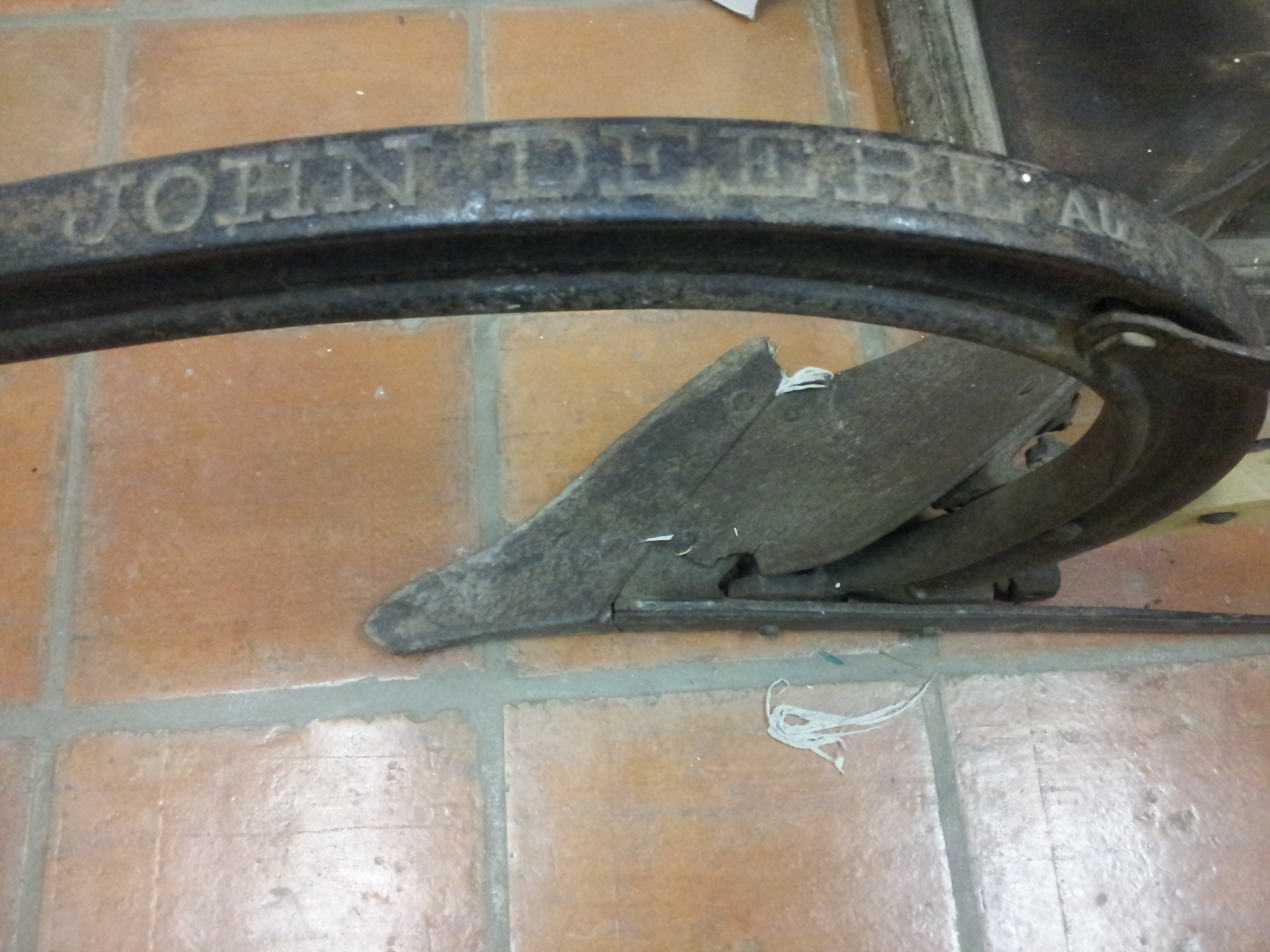
Museum John Deere plow

== See also ==
- National Register of Historic Places listings in Maverick County, Texas
- Forts of Texas
