= Fort Gates =

- Ghost Town
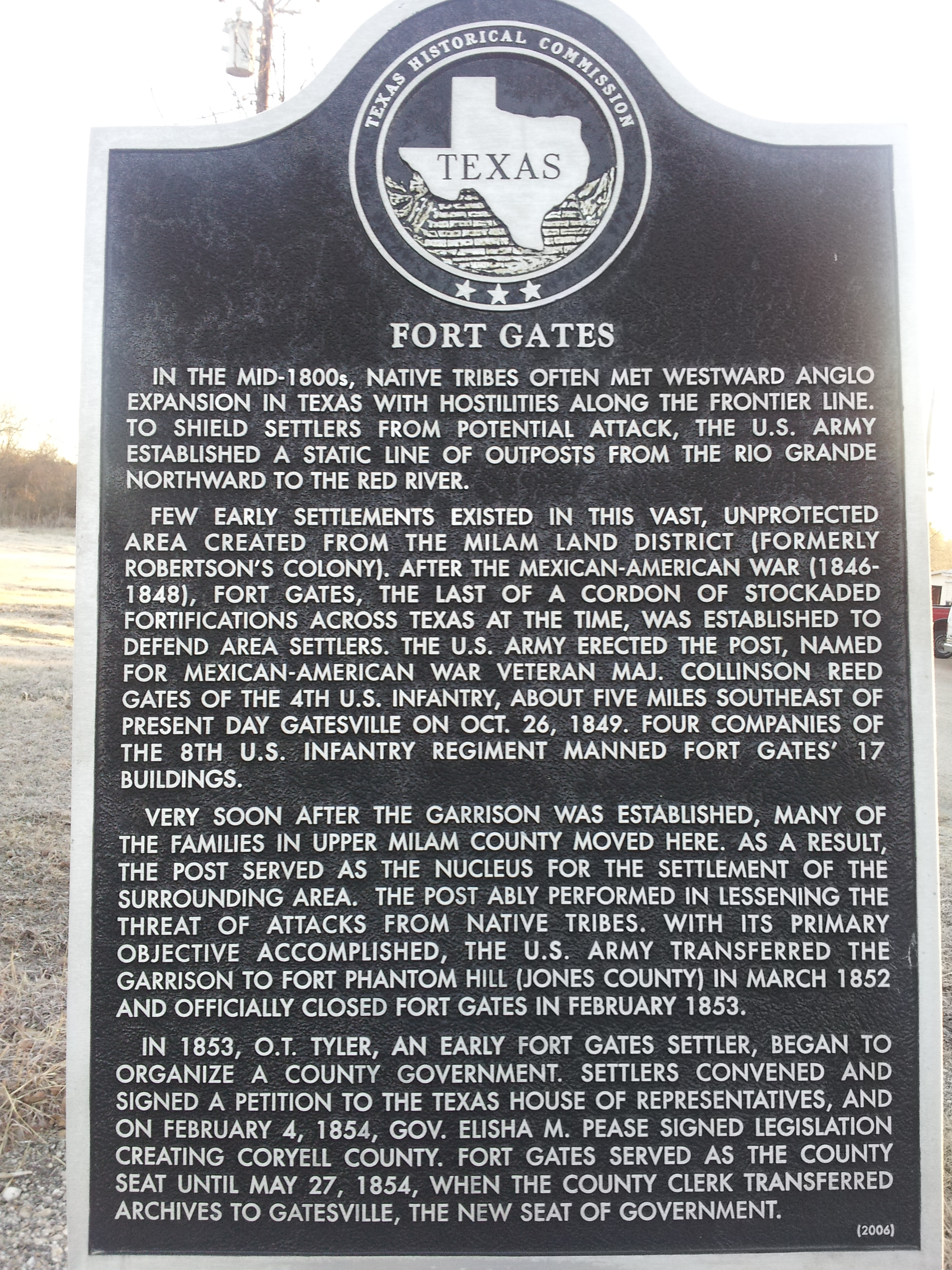
- Fort Gates Texas Historical Marker

- Location within Texas
- Coordinates: 31°23′26″N 97°41′02″W
- Country: United States
- State: Texas
- County: Coryell
- U.S. Army Fort: October 26, 1849
- Elevation: 761 ft (232 m)
- Time zone: UTC-6 (Central (CST))
  - Summer (DST): UTC-5 (MDT)
- GNIS feature ID: 1379787

Fort Gates, was a United States Army fort established on October 26, 1849, as Camp Gates by Captain William Reading Montgomery and two companies of the Eighth United States Infantry. The fort was located on the north bank of the Leon River about five miles east of the site of present Gatesville, Texas. The installation was named for Brevet Major Collinson Reed Gates of New York, a noted officer in the Battle of Palo Alto and the Battle of Resaca de la Palma. The fort was established to protect settlers on the Texas frontier from Indians. The fort was garrisoned by companies D, I, F, and H of the Eighth United States Infantry. In April 1851, 256 enlisted men and forty-five officers were stationed at Fort Gates, the most reported in a single month.

A line of seven army posts were established in 1848-49 after the Mexican War to protect the settlers of West Texas and included Fort Worth, Fort Graham, Fort Gates, Fort Croghan, Fort Martin Scott, Fort Lincoln and Fort Duncan.

The fort had four officers' quarters, two for company quarters, three for laundresses, one for muleteers and employees, a hospital, a stable, a forage house, two storehouses, a guardhouse, a bakehouse, and a blacksmith shop. Commanding officers at Fort Gates were Montgomery (1849–50), James G. S. Snelling (1850–51), Carlos Adolphus Waite (1851–52), and Horace Haldeman (1852). Lieutenant George Pickett, leader of "Pickett's Charge" at Gettysburg, was stationed at Fort Gates in 1850–51. The fort was abandoned in March 1852.

== See also ==
- Fort Worth
- Fort Graham
- Fort Croghan
- Fort Martin Scott
- Fort Inge
- Fort Duncan
