= Fort Lincoln, Texas =

Coordinates: 29.3600°N 99.2839°W

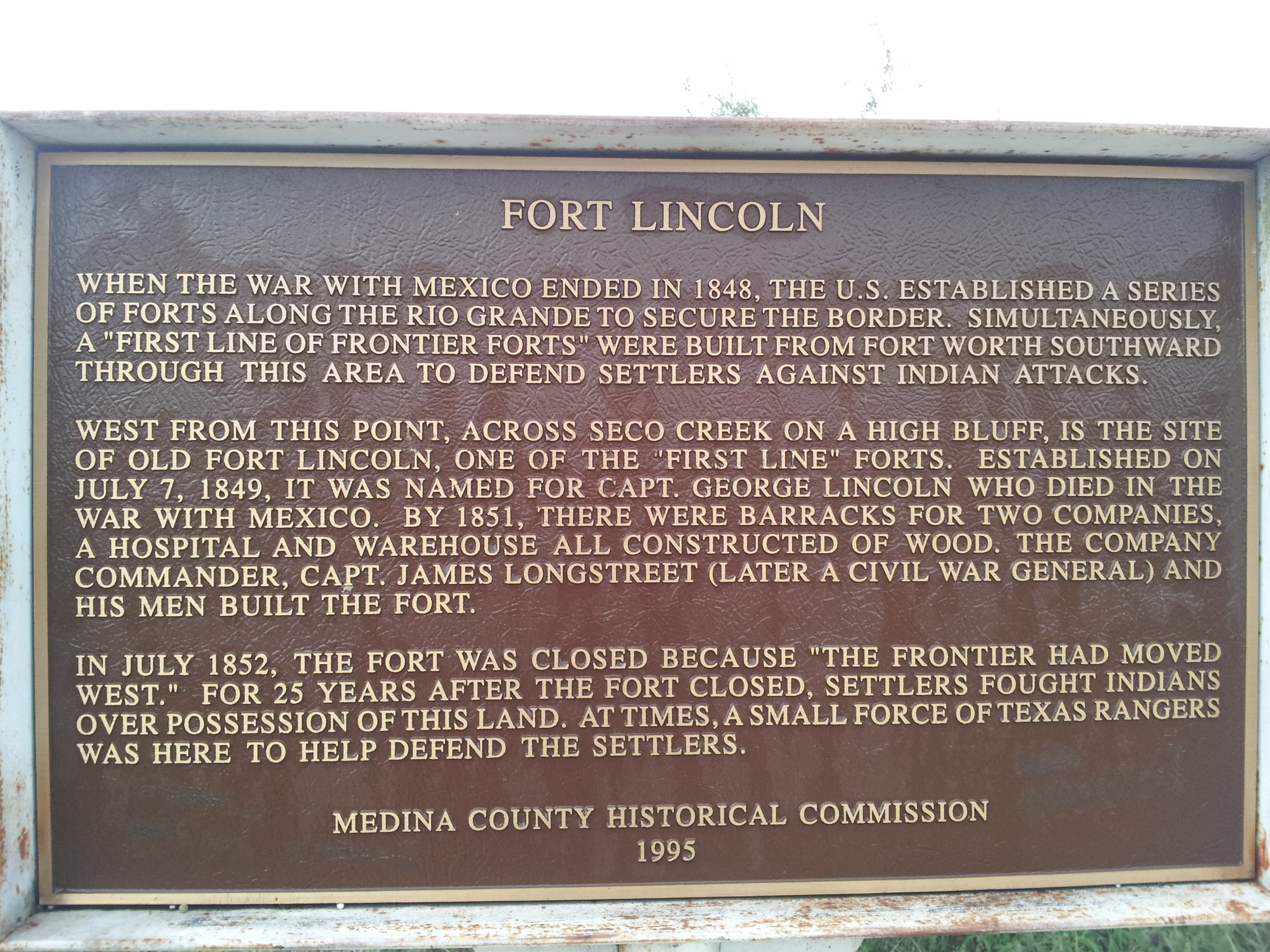
Historical Marker

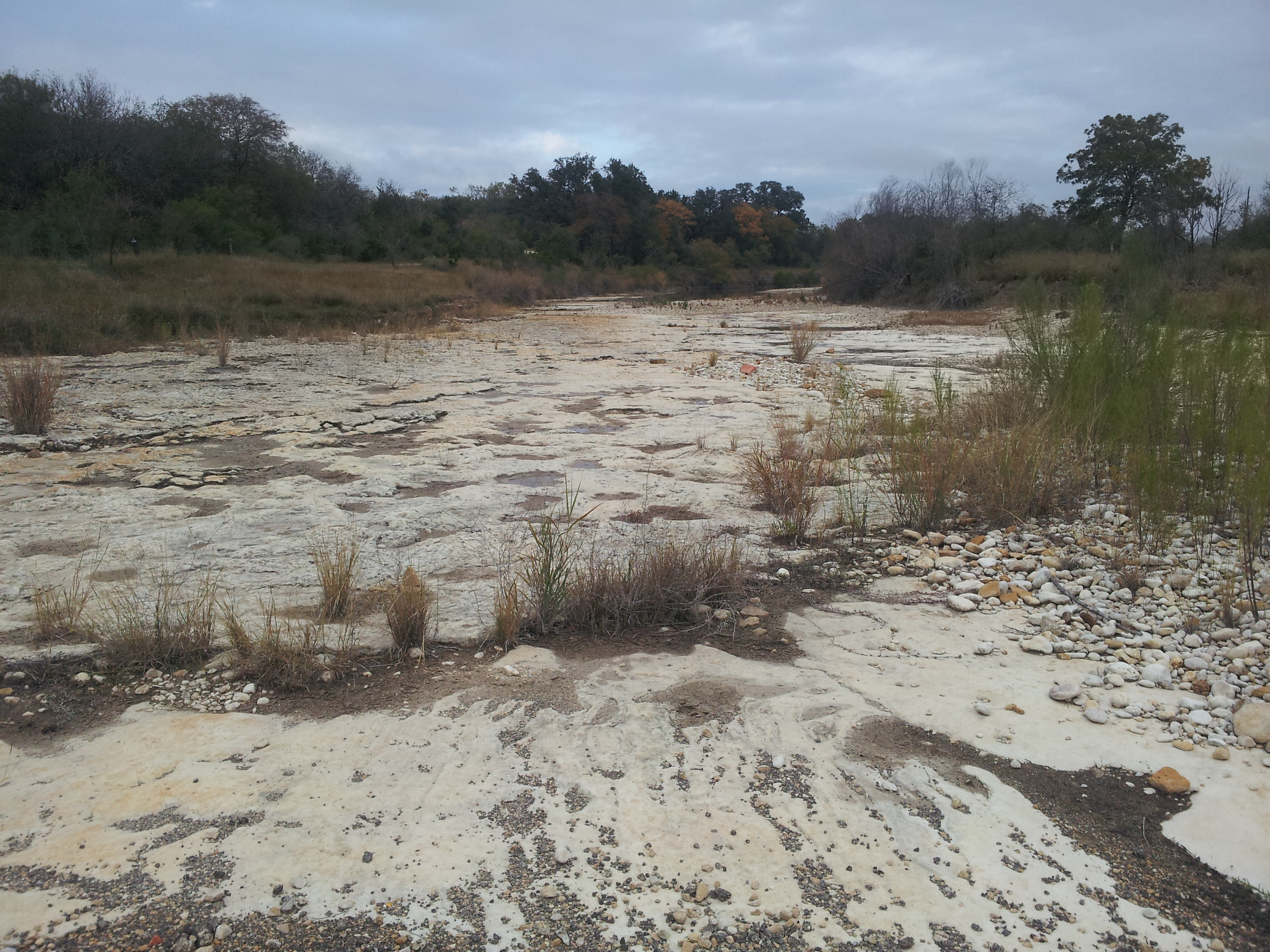
Seco Creek in front of the fort

Fort Lincoln is a town in Medina County, Texas. It was established on July 7, 1849, by Major James Longstreet, with two companies of the Eighth United States Infantry, after the Mexican–American War. The fort is named in honor of Captain George Lincoln who was killed in the Battle of Buena Vista. The fort was abandoned on July 20, 1852.

A line of seven army posts were established in 1848-49 after the Mexican War to protect the settlers of West Texas and included Fort Worth, Fort Graham, Fort Gates, Fort Croghan, Fort Martin Scott, Fort Lincoln and Fort Duncan.

Other famous officers stationed here include Richard Irving Dodge and William Steele.
