= Fort Graham =

- Archeological & Park Site
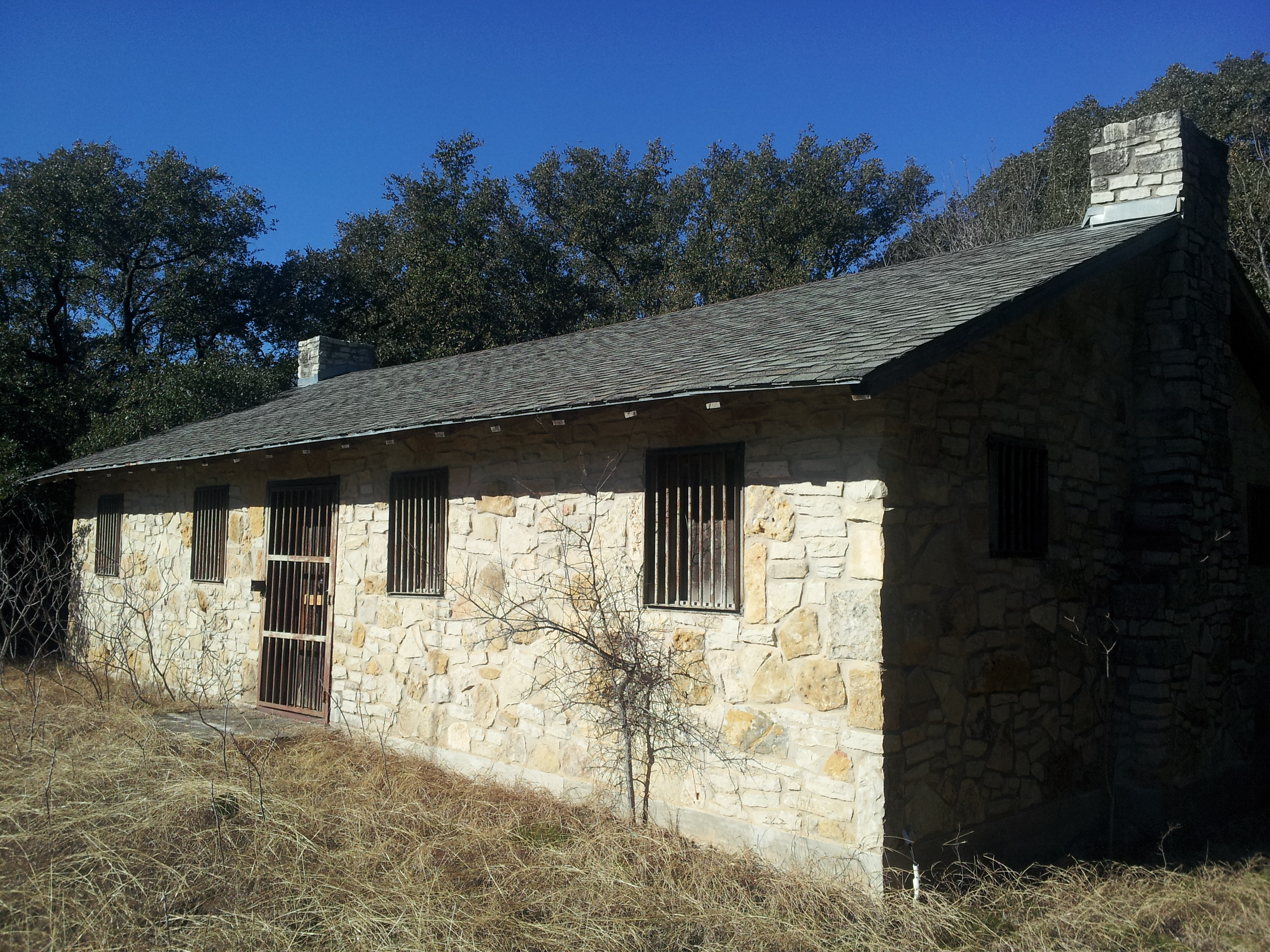
- Fort Graham Reconstructed Barracks

- Location within Texas
- Coordinates: 32°00′12.6″N 97°23′45.8″W
- Country: United States
- State: Texas
- County: Hill
- U.S. Army Fort: March 27, 1849
- Elevation: 535 ft (163 m)
- Time zone: UTC-6 (Central (CST))
  - Summer (DST): UTC-5 (MDT)

Fort Graham was a pioneer fort established in 1849 by Brevet Major R.A. Arnold (Companies F and I of the Second United States Dragoons) at the site of Jose Maria Village, an Anadaca camp on the western edge of present-day Hill County, Texas. It remained in service until 1853, when settlements had moved further west. It was named after Col. William M. Graham, who died at the Battle of Molino del Rey.

A line of seven army posts was established in 1848-49 after the Mexican War to protect the settlers of West Texas and included Fort Worth, Fort Graham, Fort Gates, Fort Croghan, Fort Martin Scott, Fort Lincoln, and Fort Duncan.

== Reconstruction ==
In 1936, the Texas Centennial Commission granted Hill County $6,700 to purchase the land upon which the Fort stood and reconstruct one of the buildings.

== US Army Corps of Engineers and Lake Whitney ==
In 1953, the U.S. Army Corps of Engineers took the fort site as part of the Lake Whitney project. Dr. S. Alan Skinner published, in 1974, An Evaluation of the Archaeological Resources at Lake Whitney, Texas, Southern Methodist University contributions in anthropology No. 14. The Corps, in accordance with the 1936 dedication, operated a park on the site until 1982 at which time Hill County, Texas was forced to enter into a lease for the property or lose this culturally significant resource.

== Preservation ==
In 1983, a group of local citizens led by Mrs. Selma Hill raised $15,000 to move the building, determined that the fort be preserved. At this time, the building was only three years from being eligible for the National Register on its own merits, but the citizens were never informed of this. Had it achieved National Register status, the Corps would have been forced to take preservative action.

The citizens of the county continued to maintain the site until 2002, when the corps came before the county demanding that a minimum of $60,000 be spent for the revitalization of the area. Hill County did not have sufficient funds, thus it relinquished the lease.

Depictions of Fort Graham Preservation
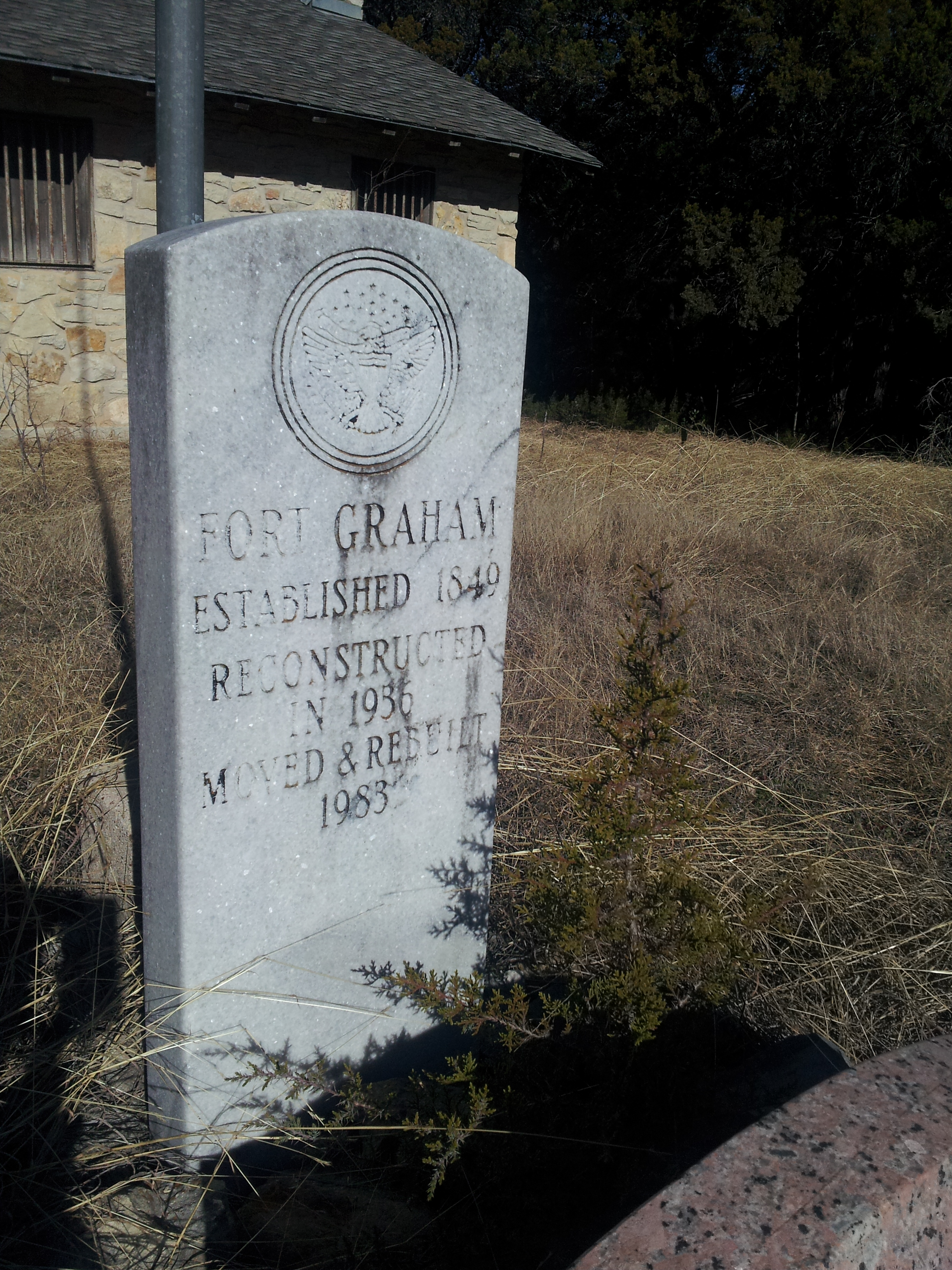
Fort Graham building "reconstructed, moved and rebuilt" marker

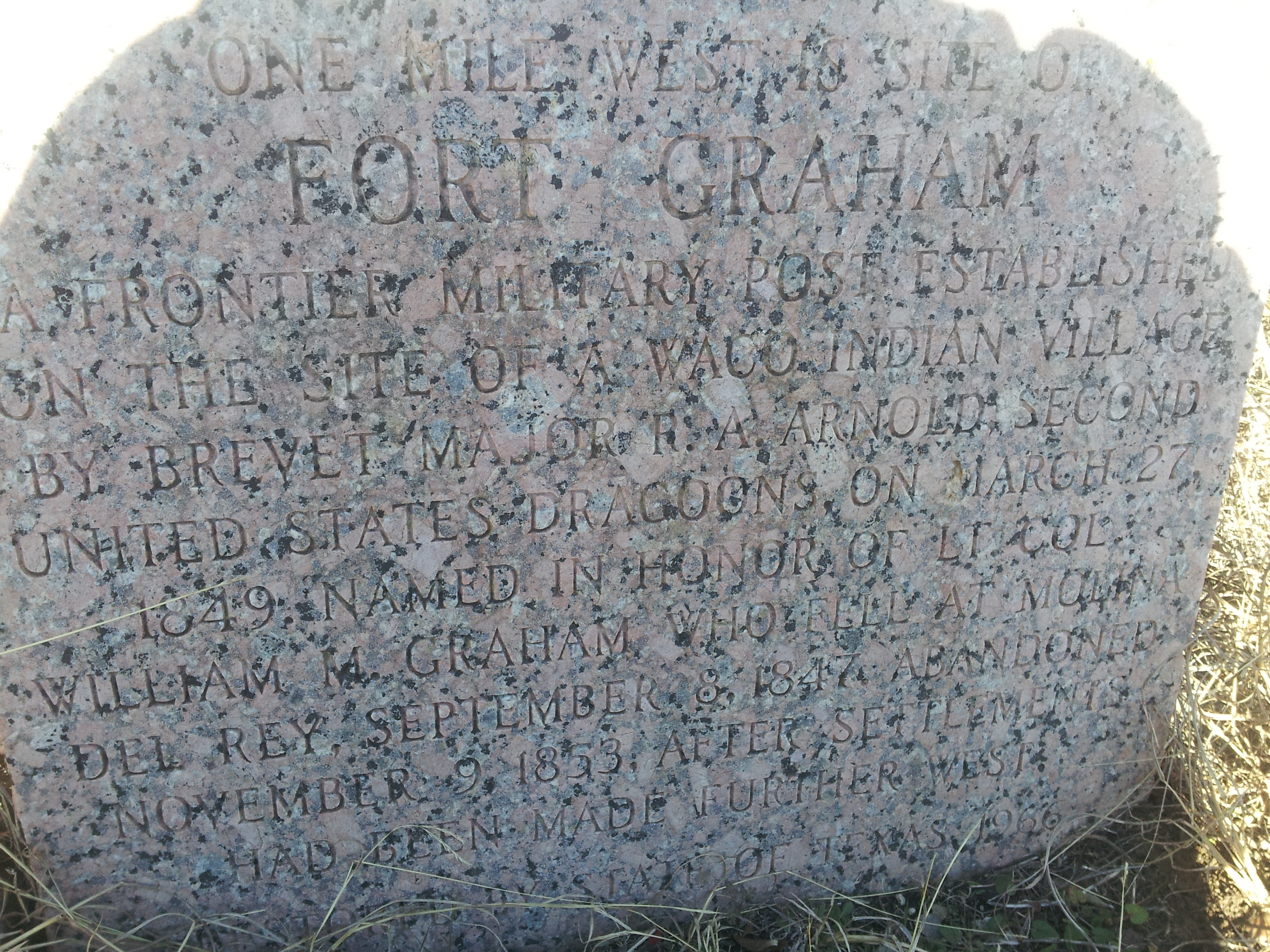
Fort Graham Historical Marker

== Fort Graham Preservation Society ==
The Fort Graham Preservation Society, Inc. is a nonprofit corporation established to ensure that the memory of Fort Graham is not lost. It is currently working with federal and county agencies to preserve and revitalize Fort Graham Park and archeological site.

== See also ==
- Fort Worth
- Fort Gates
- Fort Croghan
- Fort Martin Scott
- Fort Inge
- Fort Duncan
