= National Register of Historic Places listings in Maverick County, Texas =

Location of Maverick County in Texas

This is a list of the National Register of Historic Places listings in Maverick County, Texas.

This is intended to be a complete list of properties and districts listed on the National Register of Historic Places in Maverick County, Texas. There are one district and one individual property listed on the National Register in the county. Both are State Antiquities Landmark while the individual property is also a Recorded Texas Historic Landmark. The district includes one Recorded Texas Historic Landmark within its boundary.

This National Park Service list is complete through NPS recent listings posted March 21, 2025.

== Current listings ==
The locations of National Register properties and districts may be seen in a mapping service provided.

	Name on the Register	Image	Date listed	Location	City or town	Description
1	Fort Duncan	Fort Duncan	December 9, 1971 (#71000954)	Bounded by Monroe and Garrison Sts,. city limits on the S, and the Rio Grande on the W 28°42′07″N 100°30′17″W	Eagle Pass	State Antiquities Landmark, contains Recorded Texas Historic Landmark
2	Maverick County Courthouse	Maverick County Courthouse	February 15, 1980 (#80004141)	Public Sq. 28°42′32″N 100°30′05″W	Eagle Pass	State Antiquities Landmark, Recorded Texas Historic Landmark

== See also ==
- National Register of Historic Places listings in Texas
- Recorded Texas Historic Landmarks in Maverick County
