= Ripley A. Arnold =

- Born: Ripley A. Arnold; January 17, 1817; Pearlington, Mississippi, U.S.
- Died: 1853 (aged 35–36); Fort Graham, Texas
- Burial place: Pioneers Rest Cemetery in Fort Worth, Texas
- Military career
- Allegiance: United States
- Branch: United States Army
- Service years: 1838–1853
- Rank: Major
- Unit: Second Dragoons
- Conflicts: Battle of Big Hummock

Ripley A. Arnold (1817–1853) was a major in the United States Army and founder of Camp Worth in 1849, later renamed Fort Worth, Texas. In 2014 a 22-foot statue was dedicated to Arnold. It was erected along the Trinity River below the army camp site he established and named after one of his military commanders.

== Early life ==
Arnold was born in Pearlington, Mississippi, on January 17, 1817, to Willis Arnold.

== Army life ==
He was appointed to West Point in 1834 and graduated thirty-third in his class. He was sent to the Second Dragoons in Florida in 1838 and brevetted captain in 1842 for gallantry in the Seminole War and major in 1846 for his role in the battle of Palo Alto. After the Mexican–American War, he was given command of Company F of the Second Dragoons and sent to Texas to establish a military post close to the Trinity River. After locating a suitable site, Arnold left Fort Graham with 42 dragoons to establish Camp Worth, named after his former commanding officer, who had recently died of cholera in San Antonio. It was completed by the winter of 1849 and later renamed Fort Worth.

== Personal life ==
He eloped with Catherine Bryant on August 26, 1839.

== Death ==
Ripley Arnold was killed by Josephus Steiner in a duel at Fort Graham, Texas, where Arnold was the commanding officer and Steiner the physician. He was buried at Fort Graham, and was reinterred and reburied in Fort Worth at Pioneers Rest Cemetery.
