= History of Fort Worth, Texas =

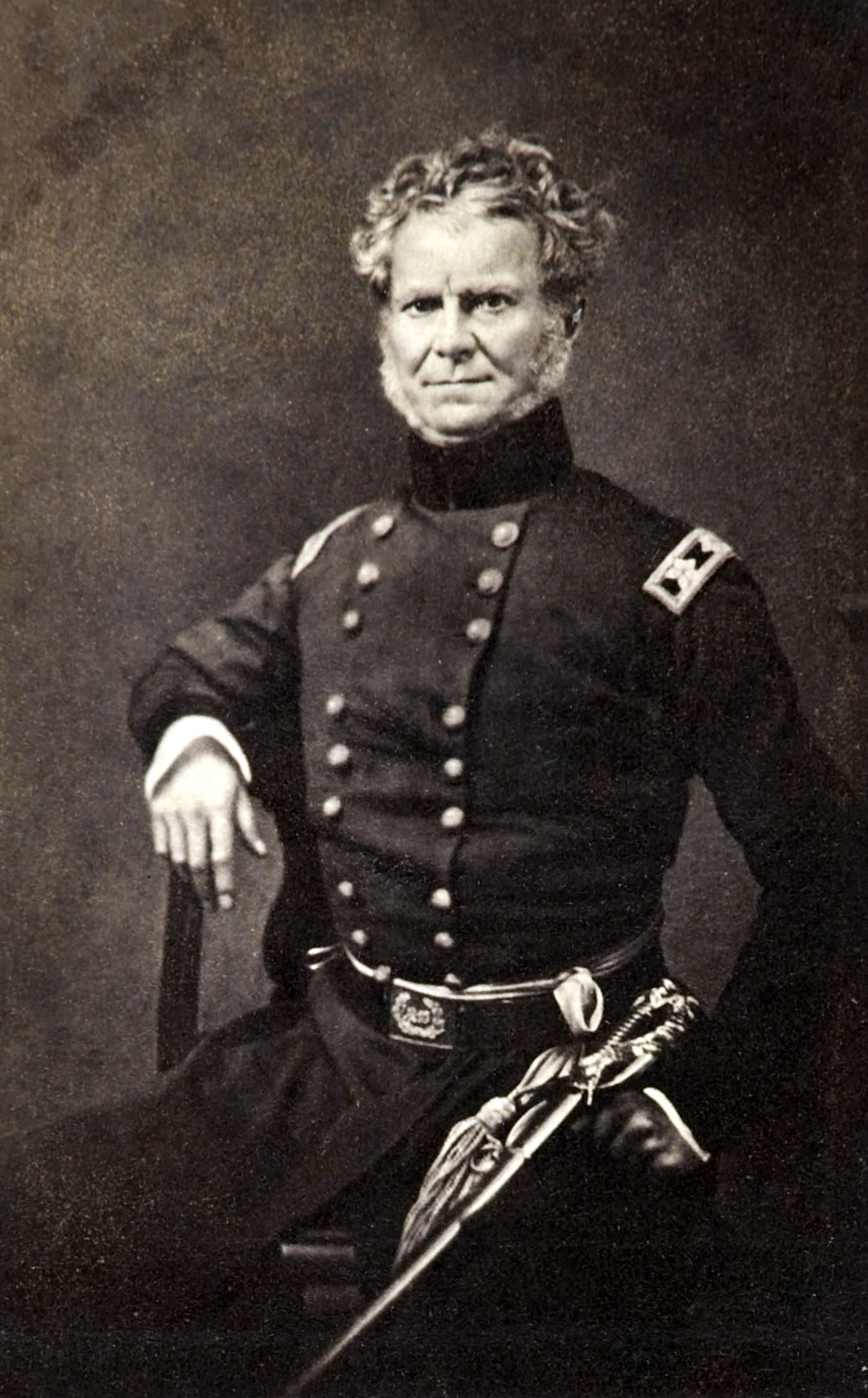
General Worth by Mathew Brady

The history of Fort Worth, Texas, in the United States is closely intertwined with that of northern Texas and the Texan frontier. From its early history as an outpost and a threat against Native American residents, to its later days as a booming cattle town, to modern times as a corporate center, the city has changed dramatically, although it still preserves much of its heritage in its modern culture.

== Early history ==
=== Treaty of Bird's Fort ===
The Treaty of Bird's Fort between the Republic of Texas and several Indian tribes was signed in 1843 at Bird's Fort in present-day Euless, Texas. Article XI of the treaty provided that no one may "pass the line of trading houses" (at the border of the Indians' territory) without permission of the President of Texas, and may not reside or remain in the Indians' territory. These "trading houses" were later established at the junction of the Clear Fork and West Fort of the Trinity River, where Fort Worth was later built by the US Army. At this river junction, the U.S. War Department established Fort Worth in 1849 as the northernmost of a system of forts for protecting the American Frontier after the end of the Mexican–American War. The City of Fort Worth continues to be known as "where the West begins."

=== After the Mexican–American War ===
In January 1849, U.S. Army General William Jenkins Worth, a veteran of the Mexican–American War, proposed building ten forts to mark and protect the west Texas frontier, situated from Eagle Pass to the confluence of the West Fork and Clear Fork of the Trinity River. Worth died on 7 May 1849 from cholera. General William S. Harney was assigned to Worth's position. He ordered Major Ripley A. Arnold to find a new fort site near the confluence of the West and Clear Forks. On 6 June 1849, Arnold established a post on the banks of the Trinity and named it Camp Worth in honor of the late General Worth. In August 1849, Arnold moved the camp to a north-facing bluff that overlooked the mouth of the Clear Fork. The US War Department officially granted the name "Fort Worth" to the post on 14 November 1849.

=== Development of the town ===
Although Native Americans were still attempting to defend and maintain their traditional territory, European-American pioneers quickly settled near the fort. In the process of relocating the camp to the bluff, Arnold found George "Press" Farmer living there and allowed him to open the first sutler's store. Other early settlers were Howard W. Peak, Ed Terrell, George W. Terrell, and Ephraim M. Daggett. When a new line of forts was built further west, the U.S. Army evacuated Fort Worth on 17 September 1853. The settlers decided to take possession of the fort site. John Peter Smith opened a school in 1854 to twelve students; Archibald Leonard and Henry Daggett started the first department stores. Julian Feild opened a flour mill and general store in 1856, and the Butterfield Overland Mail and the Southern Pacific Stage Line used the town as their western terminus on the westward journey to California.

In 1855, a battle over the placement of the county seat erupted. Since 1849 the county seat had been Birdville, but in 1855 Fort Worth citizens decided that they wanted to claim the county seat. After a long fight, Fort Worth gained the title in 1860 and construction began on a stone county courthouse. After a delay due to the Civil War, the courthouse was completed in the 1870s.

Fort Worth settlers held slaves in its antebellum period. In 1860, Tarrant County had 5,170 whites and 850 slaves. When the question came to secede from the Union, most citizens were for secession, and Tarrant County voted for it. The effects of the Civil War and Reconstruction nearly wiped Fort Worth off the map during the 1860s. The city's population dropped as low as 175 and food, supply, and money shortages burdened the citizens. As the War's effects began to fade, so did the city's hardships. It gradually began to revive in the 1870s. By 1872, William C. Boaz, William Henry Davis, and Jacob Samuels opened general stores. In 1873, Khleber M. Van Zandt established Tidball, Van Zandt, and Company, which became the Fort Worth National Bank in 1884. Barrooms such as Tom Prindle's Saloon and Steele's Tavern welcomed many travelers. In 1876, future Denver, Colorado crime boss, Soapy Smith arrived in Fort Worth and began his criminal career, operating his famous soap sell confidence tricks on the unwary. Weekly newspapers included the Fort Worth Chief and the Democrat. Schools reopened gradually after the war. In 1869 Randolph, Addison, and Ida Clark taught six students in a local church.

The cattle industry was key to producing the economic boom years of Fort Worth and its association as "Cowtown." Fort Worth was a good resting point for cowboys driving their cattle to Abilene, Kansas. As many northern cattle buyers established headquarters in Fort Worth, new businesses set up in the city, including Pendery and Wilson's Liquor Wholesale, B. C. Evans dry goods, and Martin B. Loyd's Exchange Office. In 1873 Fort Worth was incorporated with a mayor-council government, and W. P. Burts was elected as the city's first mayor.

=== Panther City ===
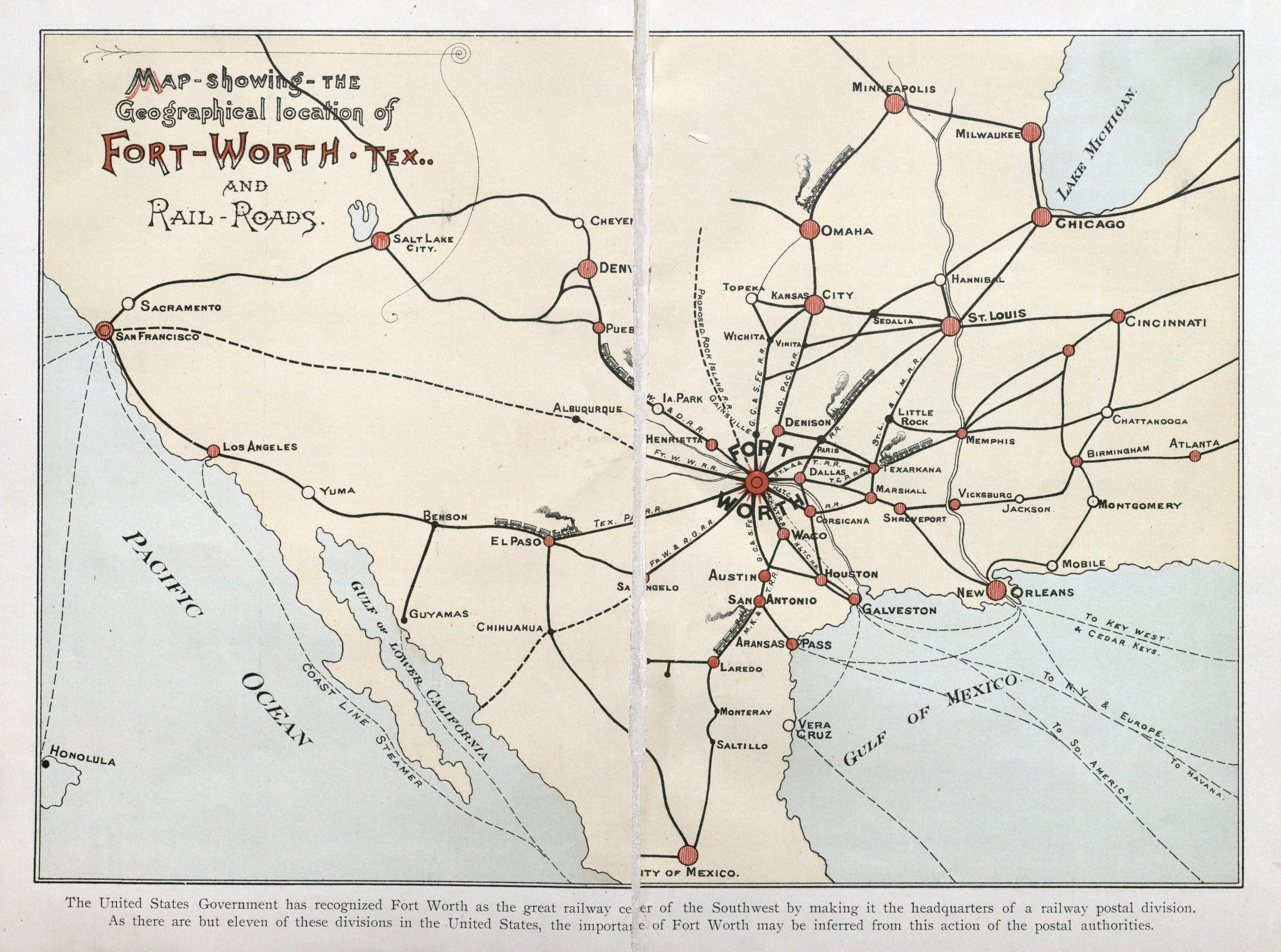
Map – showing – the Geographical location of Fort-Worth, Tex., and Rail-Roads, 1888

In 1875, the Dallas Herald published an article by a former Fort Worth lawyer, Robert E. Cowart, noting the drop in population due to the Panic of 1873 and harsh winter, had dealt a severe blow to the cattle industry. The railroad company had stopped laying track 30 miles (48 km) outside of Fort Worth, and Cowart said the city was so torpid that he saw a panther asleep in the street outside the courthouse. Although an intended insult, the nickname Panther City was embraced by residents as Fort Worth recovered the next year from the depression. In 1876, the Texas and Pacific Railway arrived in Fort Worth, causing a boom and transforming the Fort Worth Stockyards into a premier cattle industry center of wholesale trade. The arrival of the railroad ushered in an era of tremendous growth, as migrants from other areas of the war-torn South continued to swell the population. Newly dubbed the "Queen City of the Prairies", Fort Worth supplied a regional market via the growing transportation market.

== 20th century ==
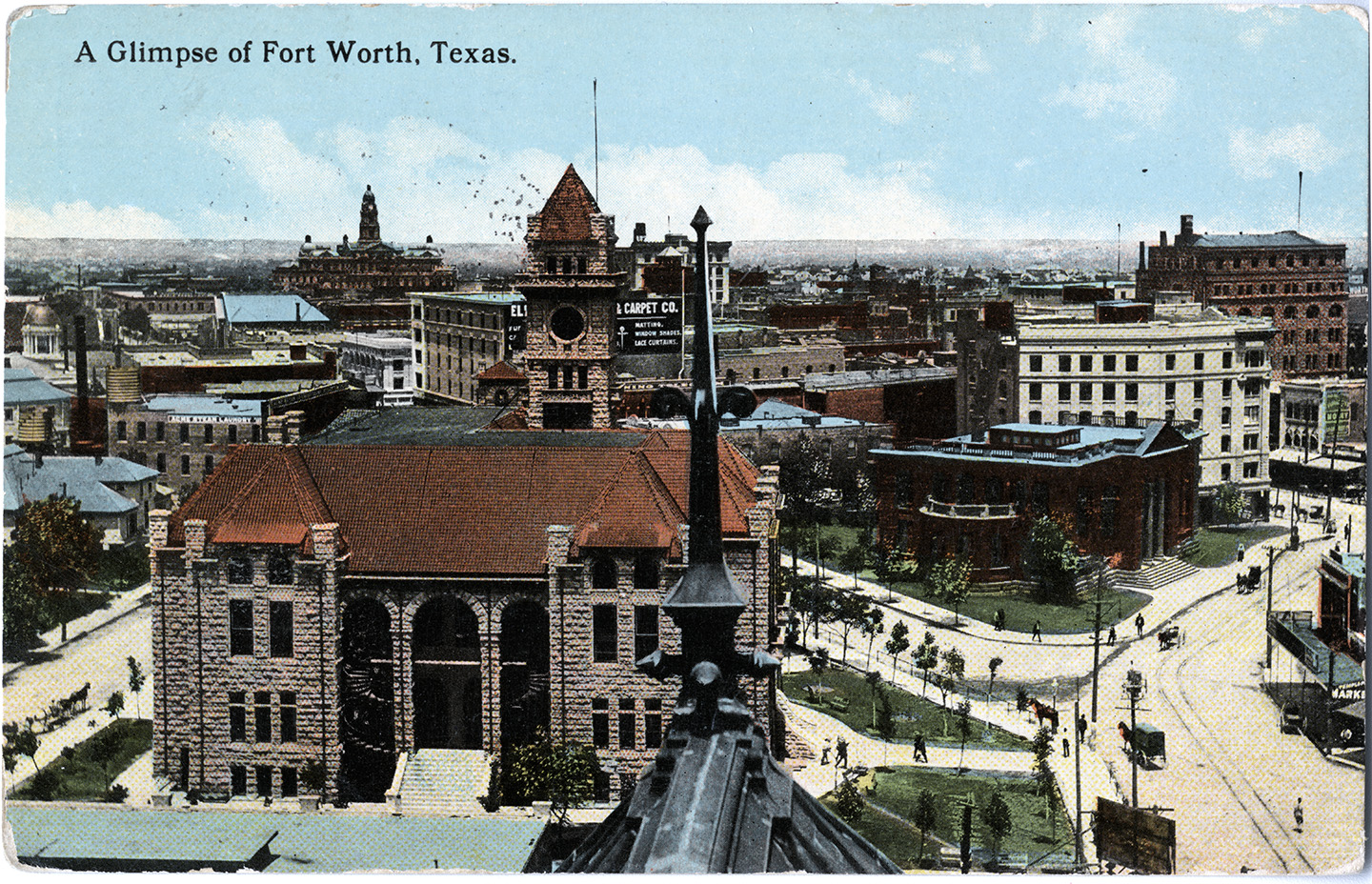
Postcard of Fort Worth, 1916

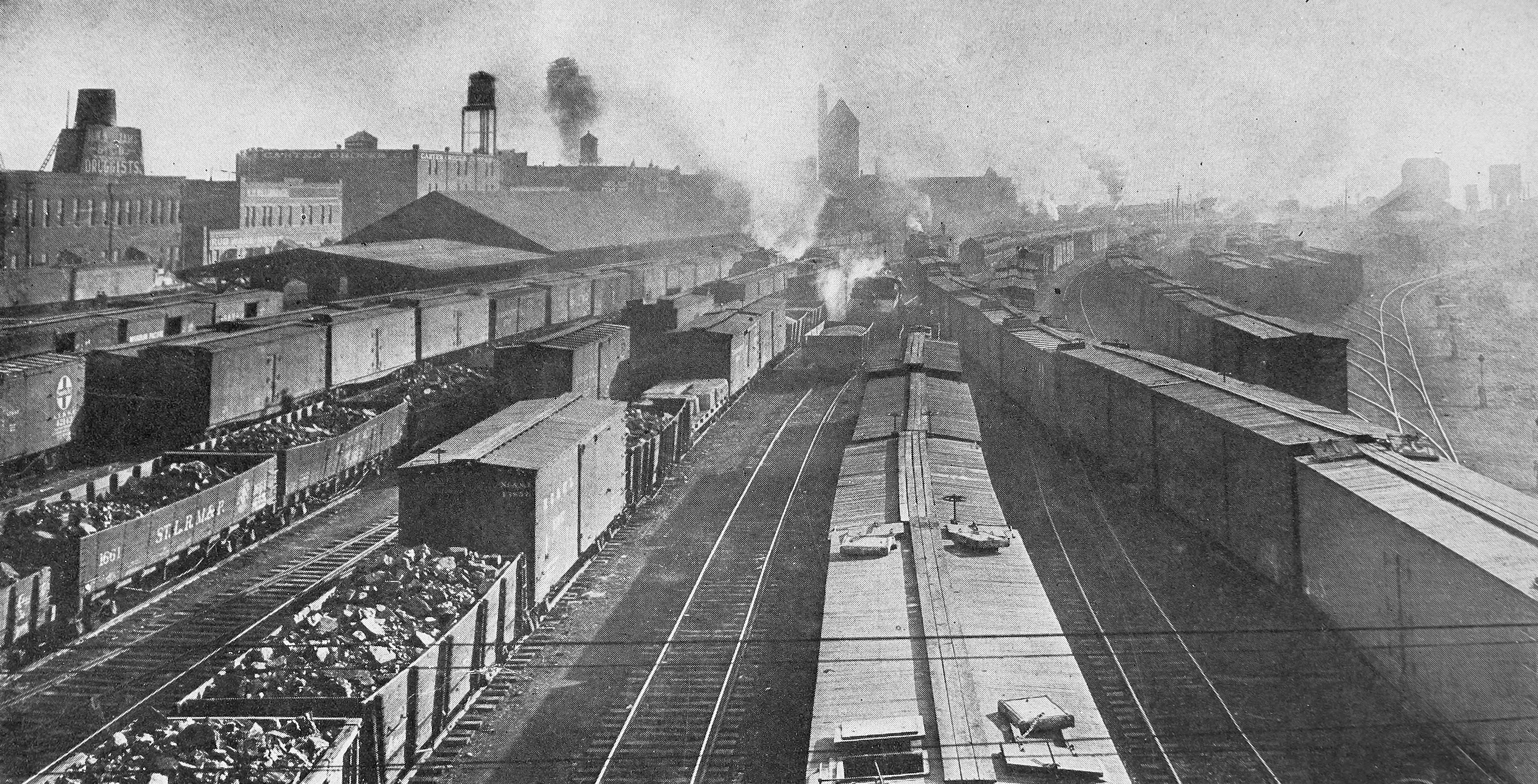
Texas and Pacific Railway yard in Fort Worth, 1916

=== New industries ===
In 1902 the Swift and Armour meat packing companies set up facilities in Fort Worth. Their arrival meant employment for thousands of workers, greatly increasing the prosperity of the town. As a result, the town's population tripled in size from 26,600 people to more than 73,000, and it attracted migrants from rural areas, as well as immigrants. Texas had a segregated society, and often excluded blacks from the better jobs in new industries such as meat packing. The Fort Worth Gas Company was created in 1909 and began serving almost 4,000 customers via a 90 miles (140 km) pipeline from Petrolia, Texas.

W.K. Gordon, superintendent of the Texas Pacific Coal Company, believed there was oil in the town of Ranger, 90 miles (140 km) away from Fort Worth. While he was testing for oil, a message came in from the headquarters in New York, saying, "Believe had made mistake, suggest you stop drilling". In October 1917, after Gordon had convinced the president to let him drill a little deeper, he struck a large oil deposit, transforming Ranger into a boom town of 30,000. Oil was also discovered in the towns of Desdemona, Breckenridge, and Burkburnett. Fort Worth was strategically located between these towns, which stimulated its economy. Even before the oil boom, the city had three oil refineries. By the summer of 1920, five more had been built, with four more under construction.

=== The First World War ===
In 1917, the Canadian government established three airfields, named Taliaferro 1, 2, and 3. When the United States entered World War I, the fields were taken over by the U.S. military, with two of them being renamed Carruthers Field and Barron Field. Camp Bowie was built in 1917 on 1,410 acres (5.7 km^{2}) at a cost of US$3,000,000. Over 5,000 people worked on it, constructing over 1,500 buildings. Named for Jim Bowie, it is home to the 36th Infantry Division. After the war, it became a demobilization center, preparing soldiers for entry into civilian life before it closed on August 15, 1919.

=== Inter-war Period ===
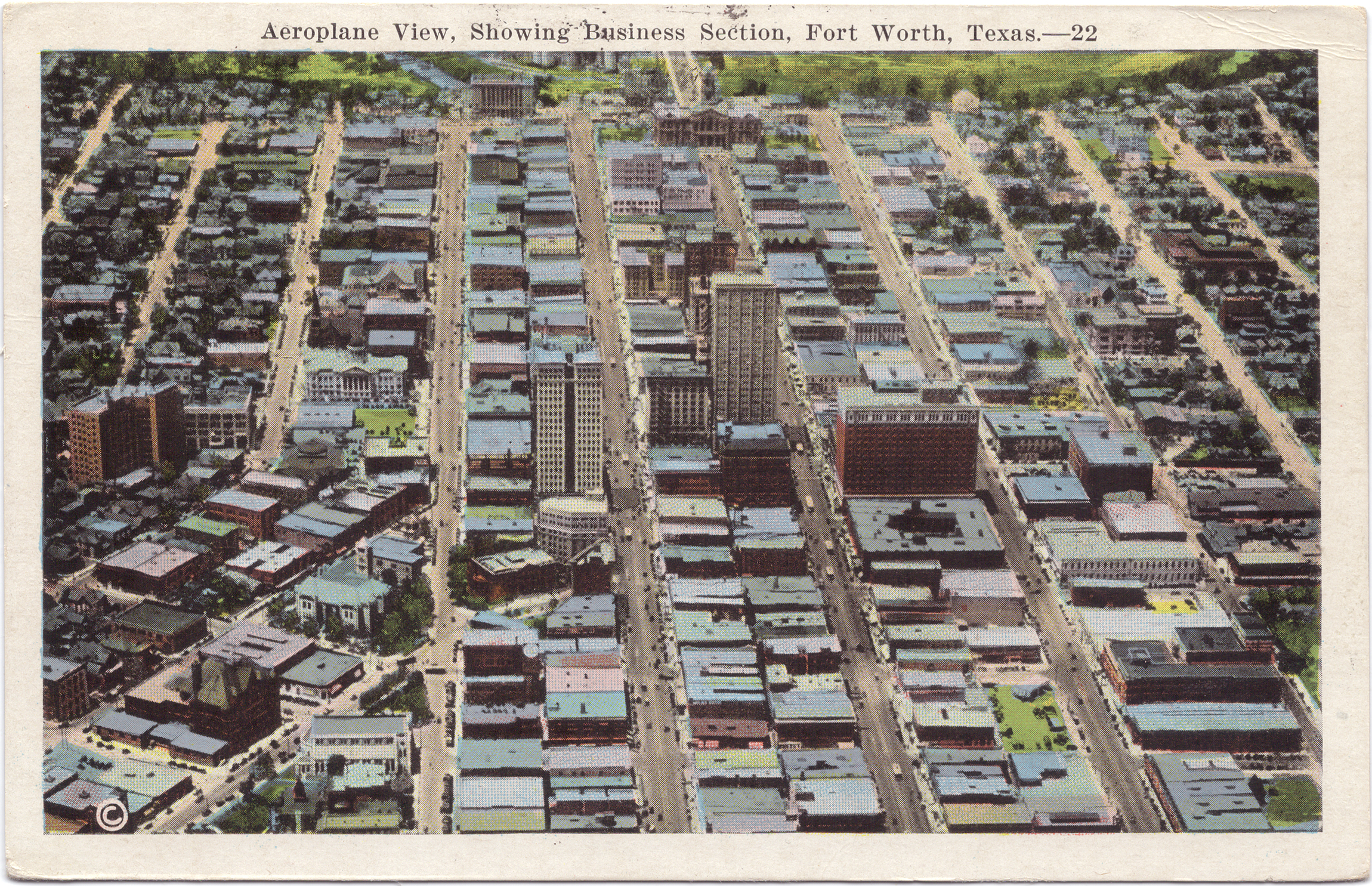
Postcard of an aerial view of downtown Fort Worth, 1927

In 1916, construction on Lake Worth (Texas) was completed at a cost of US$1,000,000. It initially had a capacity of 21,800 acre-feet, but this was later increased to 33,600 acre-feet. A group of entrepreneurs noticed that people often went to the beach for entertainment. They built a boardwalk, bathhouse, rides, and a ballroom, which came to be known as Casino Park.

In 1918, George E. Kessler oversaw construction of a new, nine-mile long street that went through the Arlington Heights neighborhood. Originally named Arlington Heights Boulevard, it was renamed Camp Bowie Boulevard in 1919, in honor of the soldiers trained in Fort Worth who fought in World War I. The camp's commanding officer supervised the planting of over 700 trees, the first of many beautification projects in Fort Worth.

In 1919, Norton Hinckley and David Tandy founded the Hinckley-Tandy Leather Company, which made leather shoe parts to sell to shoe stores. It was turned into a leather craft company by Charles D. Tandy when shoe rationing during World War II nearly bankrupted the business. The company grew, and in 1963 they bought RadioShack, an electronics store based in Boston. They were a competitor for larger electronics companies such as Commodore International, Apple Inc., and Microsoft. In 2000, Tandy Corporation officially became the RadioShack Corporation.

During the summer of 1936, the Casa Mañana was built by Amon G. Carter, founder of the Fort Worth Star-Telegram, as an amphitheater with the world's largest rotating stage. The theater produced Wild West shows and musicals for several years, but its high overhead and a drop in attendance, as people's attention was diverted to the impending wars, caused it to shut down. The building was later scrapped for the war effort. A smaller Casa Mañana was rebuilt in 1958, thanks to a bond election and the support of the City Council. It is one of Fort Worth's well-known monuments.

=== World War II ===
In 1941, the U.S. Army established the Fort Worth Army Airfield as a heavy bomber training school. In 1948, it was renamed Carswell Air Force Base.

== See also ==
- Timeline of Dallas
