= Ottomar von Behr =

German-American meteorologist and naturalist

- Born: 1810; Anhalt-Cöthen
- Died: 1856 (aged 46); Germany
- Occupations: Meteorologist; Naturalist
- Known for: Texas Adelsverein settler
- Spouse: Louisa Katzfass
- Children: Four

Ottomar von Behr (alternatively spelled as Ottmar; 1810 – 1856) was a meteorologist and naturalist, who became an Adelsverein colonist in Texas. He was the second settler at Sisterdale, Texas, and the person who gave the town its name.

== Early years ==
Baron Ottomar von Behr was born at Anhalt-Cöthen in 1810 to Chamber President August von Behr. He was a meteorologist and naturalist whose circle of friends included geographer-naturalist Alexander von Humboldt and Bettina von Arnim, for whom the Llano County commune of Bettina, Texas was named.

== Texas ==
Behr first came to Texas via New Orleans aboard the Itzstein and Welcker, date unknown. During 1846, he was in Houston where he made the acquaintance of Hermann Spiess. Gustav Dresel, Special Business Agent for the Adelsverein, sent correspondence in 1847 that Behr and his family had arrived from Germany and were staying with him in Galveston

=== Sisterdale ===
Behr became the second resident of the settlement he named Sisterdale, which was founded by Nicolaus Zink in 1847 on the bank of the Sister Creek. Ottomar von Behr first purchased a ranch two miles south of Sisterdale on what became FM 1376. Louise and Ottomar purchased an additional ranch, ten miles north of Boerne, with the same location. He developed a cross breed of sheep by breeding imported German sheep with Mexican sheep. Behr was appointed the first postmaster of Sisterdale on October 23, 1851. On October 16–17, 1853, Behr and three other vocalists represented Sisterdale at the first Texas Sängerfest in New Braunfels, sponsored by the New Braunfels Gesangverein.

Sisterdale was one of the Latin Settlements, resulting from the Revolutions of 1848 in the German states. Those who came were Forty-Eighters, intellectual liberal abolitionists who enjoyed conversing in Latin and believed in utopian ideals that guaranteed basic human rights to all. They reveled in passionate conversations about literature, music and philosophy. The free thinkers petitioned the Texas Congress in 1853 for a charter to operate a German-English college to be built at Sisterdale, but the petition did not come to fruition. Visitors to Behr's Sisterdale home included Duke Paul Wilhelm of Württemberg, John Russell Bartlett, and Frederick Law Olmsted, who admired his lending library, pictures, and harpsichord.

Among the other original settlers in Sisterdale were German geographer Ernst Kapp; Anhalt Premier progeny journalist Dr. Carl Adolph Douai; August Siemering who later founded the San Antonio Express News; author, journalist and diplomat Dr. Julius Fröbel; future Wall Street financial wiz Gustav Theissen; Edgar von Westphalen, brother to Jenny von Westphalen who was married to Karl Marx; and Edward Degener, future Republican U.S. Representative from Texas during Reconstruction.

== Personal life and death ==
Ottomar von Behr was married twice, and owned property in Germany to which he made regular trips to collect rents. Nothing is known about the first wife, except that the marriage resulted in daughters whom Behr accompanied to Germany to enroll in school. His second wife was Louise Katzfass. The Comal County census of 1850 lists Ottmar von Behr and wife Louise with three children, but it is not known if Louise or his first wife was the mother of any of the children. Behr died on a later trip to Germany in 1856. Louise von Behr and four children remained in Texas.

== Bibliography ==
- Behr, Ottmar von (1847). Guter Rath für Auswanderer nach den Vereinigten Staaten von Nordamerika, mit besonderer Berücksichtigung von Texas (Good Rath for emigrants to the United States of North America, with special consideration of Texas). Leipzig.
