= Nicolaus Zink =

German-born Texas settler

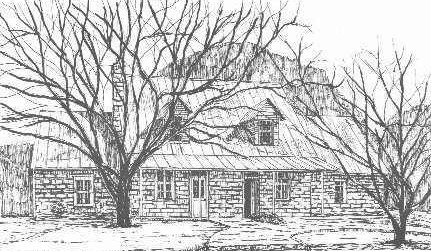
- Nicolaus Zink House, Welfare, Texas
- Born: February 4, 1812; Bamberg, Bavaria, Germany
- Died: November 3, 1887 (aged 75); Welfare, Texas, United States
- Known for: Texas Adelsverein settler Building Zinkenburg, Texas; Founding Sisterdale, Texas
- Spouses: Louise von Kheusser (div. 1847) Elisabeth Mangold Sara Agnes Williams (m. 1866)

Nicolaus Zink (1812–1887) was the founder of Sisterdale, Texas, and builder of the fort Zinkenburg. Under the direction of Prince Carl of Solms-Braunfels, Zink led a caravan of new settlers from Indianola to New Braunfels. He laid out the town and divided the original allotted farm acreage. In 1984, the Zink house in Welfare, Texas, was designed a Recorded Texas Historic Landmark, marker 3595.

== Early life ==
Nicolaus Zink was born in Bamberg, Kingdom of Bavaria, on February 4, 1812. He was a career civil engineer and former Bavarian army officer. In 1844, Zink and his wife Louise von Kheusser emigrated to Texas with other Adelsverein colonists.

== Texas ==
=== New Braunfels ===
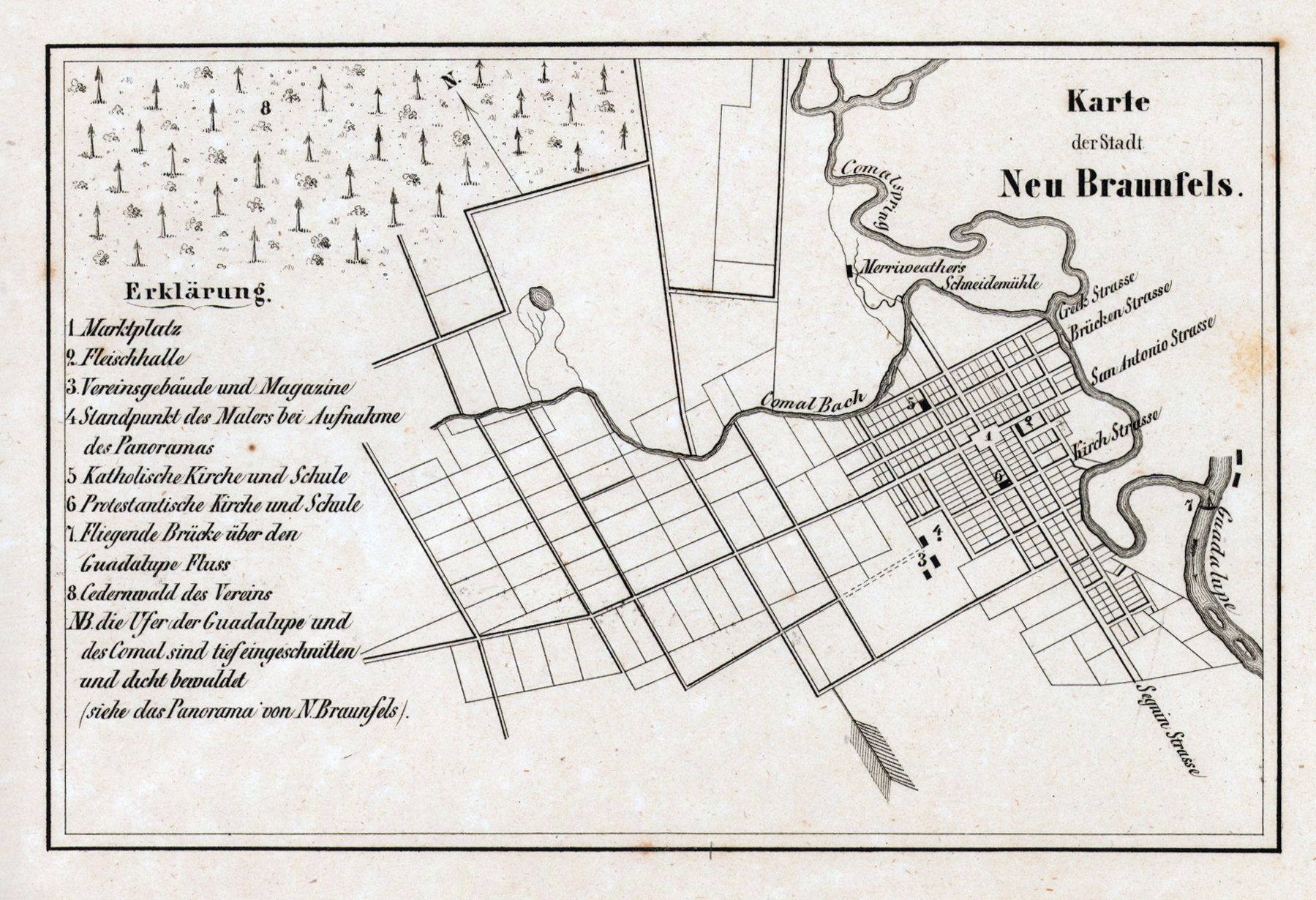
German map of New Braunfels in 1851

For four months, December 1844 to March 1845, Zink oversaw the settling of the colonists who arrived at Indianola, renamed Carlshafen in honor of Prince Carl of Solms-Braunfels. The colonists rode covered wagons, pushcarts, and walked, as Zink led them to New Braunfels, arriving on March 21, 1845. The first structure in their new home was a fort named Zinkenburg, in honor of the man who brought them from Indianola. Zink laid out the townsite and adjoining acreage. Zink Street in New Braunfels is named for him. In return for his labors, Zink was given 25 acres in New Braunfels and 100 acres of farmland. He subdivided the farm acreage and sold it in tracts. By 1846, Zink was bringing new colonists and merchandise from Houston to New Braunfels.

=== Sisterdale ===
Sisterdale on the banks of Sister Creek was settled in 1847 by Nicolaus Zink. Originally part of Comal County, Sisterdale became part of Kendall County when the latter county was formed in 1862. Zink originally intended to settle in Fredericksburg when he left New Braunfels. Zink was among the 1847 Petitioners to Create Gillespie County, Texas. Instead of Fredericksburg, Zink built a new two-story log home on Sister Creek.

Sisterdale was one of the Latin settlements, resulting from the Revolutions of 1848 in the German states. Those who came were Forty-Eighters, intellectual liberal abolitionists who enjoyed conversing in Latin and believed in utopian ideals that guaranteed basic human rights to all. They reveled in passionate conversations about literature, music, and philosophy. The free thinkers petitioned the Texas Congress in 1853 for a charter to operate a German-English college to be built at Sisterdale, but the petition did not come to fruition.

Among the other original settlers in Sisterdale were German pioneers Fritz and Betty Holekamp, geographer Ernst Kapp; Anhalt Premier progeny journalist Dr. Carl Adolph Douai; August Siemering who later founded the San Antonio Express News; author, journalist, and diplomat Dr. Julius Fröbel; future Wall Street financial wiz Gustav Theissen; Edgar von Westphalen, brother to Jenny von Westphalen who was married to Karl Marx; and Edward Degener, future Republican U.S. Representative from Texas during Reconstruction.

In Sisterdale, Zink gained success in farming, and became shrewd in his financial dealings when selling his wheat crop to the United States Army posts.

== Personal life and death ==
In 1847, Zink divorced Louise. By 1850, he was married to Elisabeth Mangold. They sold their Sisterdale home and acreage to Eduard Degener and moved to Barons Creek near Fredericksburg to start a gristmill. On June 4, 1866, Zink married Sara Agnes Williams.

In 1853, Zink was living in Comfort, which had opened to German settlements in 1852.

Zink acquired land on the Kendall County settlement of Welfare in 1868 and built a limestone house there. He died in Welfare on November 3, 1887, and is buried in an unmarked grave on the property.
