= Welfare, Texas =

Ghost town in Kendall County, Texas, United States

- Unincorporated community
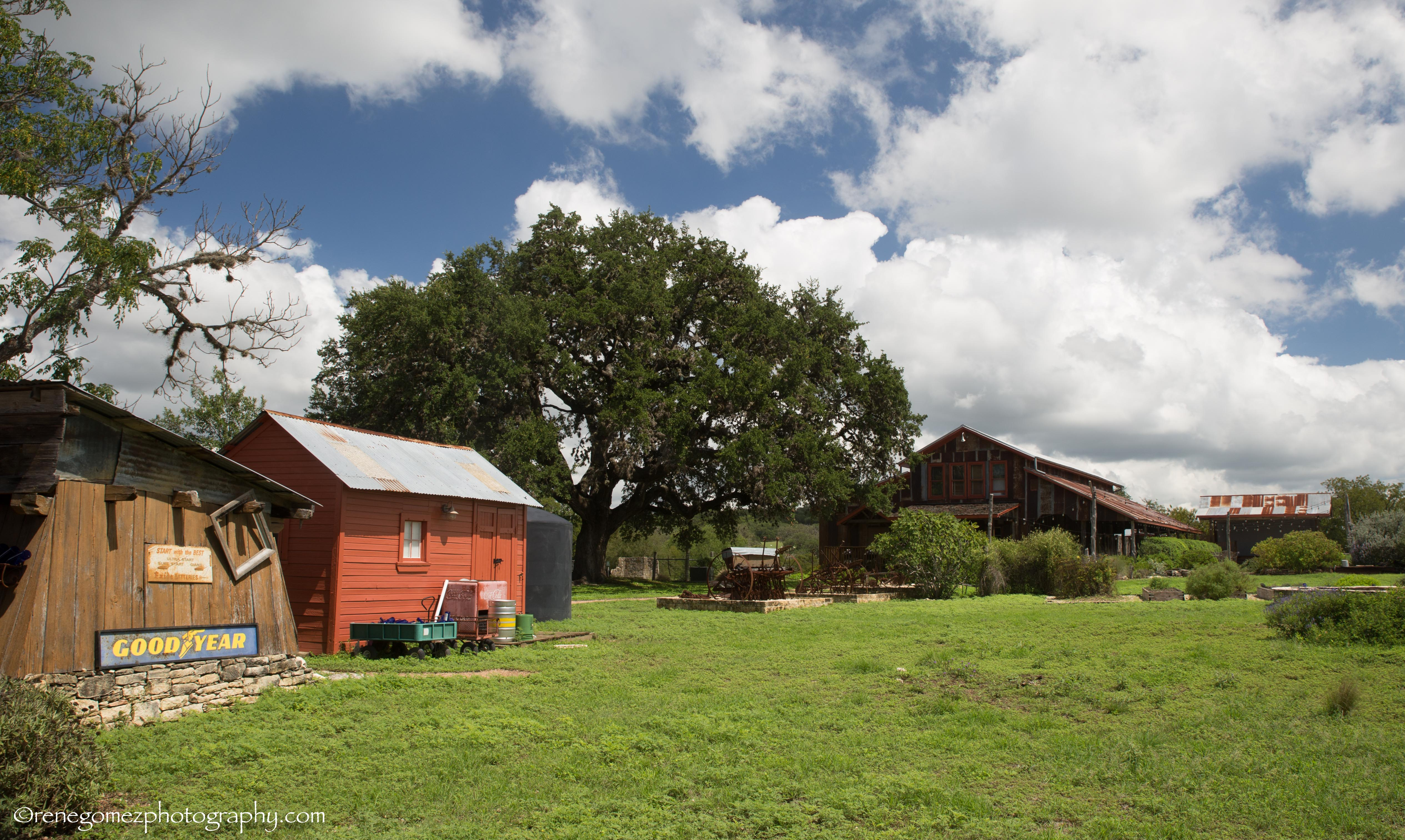
- Welfare, September 2018

- Location in Texas and the United States Welfare (the United States)
- Coordinates: 29°55′18″N 98°47′12″W
- Country: United States
- State: Texas
- County: Kendall
- Elevation: 1,348 ft (411 m)

Population (as of 2000 per Handbook of Texas)
  - Total: 36
- Time zone: UTC-6 (Central (CST))
  - Summer (DST): UTC-5 (CDT)
- Area code: 830
- FIPS code: 48
- GNIS feature ID: 2034977

Welfare is an unincorporated community 4 miles (6 km) southeast of Waring on the Waring-Welfare Road in west-central Kendall County, in the U.S. state of Texas. The school was designated a Recorded Texas Historic Landmark in 2000.

== Establishment ==
Adelsverein colonists Carl Joseph and Augusta Beseler, along with their sons Ernst and Carl Philipp, emigrated to Texas in 1848. The family settled on Carl's land grant and opened a general store. The community of Welfare grew up around the general store. The Beselers' son Ernst died in the Nueces Massacre on August 10, 1862. His brother Carl Philipp was justice of the peace, postmaster, county commissioner, and tax assessor. The general store was designated a Recorded Texas Historic Landmark in 1996, Marker number 382.

The settlement was originally named "Bon Ton" or "Boyton". The establishment of the post office in 1880 changed the name to "Welfare". Carl Philipp Beseler was the first postmaster. The post office was discontinued in 1976. The name changed to the German word Wohlfarht, translated as "pleasant trip", after Alma Wohlfarht, who with her husband Perry Laas, ran the store for 50 years.

In 1887, Carl Philipp Beseler assisted with Welfare being a railroad shipping point with the building of the San Antonio and Aransas Pass Railway track section between San Antonio and Kerrville.

== Decline ==
The community had 275 residents by 1892. Severe weather conditions, complicated by an infestation of boll weevils, caused a steady decline in the population. U.S. Highway 87 bypassed Welfare in 1930, and the railroad was abandoned in 1970. What is left of Welfare is only accessible by the Waring-Welfare country road via the Welfare exit (Exit 533) of Interstate 10.

German pioneer and founder of Sisterdale, Nicolaus Zink, retired to Welfare and died there in 1887. He was buried on his own property.

== School ==
The community of Welfare built a one-room frame-structure school in 1878 on Joshua Creek. Around 1902, the school was moved to 217 Waring-Welfare Road. By 1907, the school had separate classes for students of African ancestry. In 1912, an expansion that included a porch was completed and made possible by parent donations. The peak year for enrollment was 1916. In 1952, the school ceased operation and students began attending classes in Comfort. It was designated a Recorded Texas Historic Landmark number 12370 in 2000.

== See also ==
- List of ghost towns in Texas
