= Sisterdale, Texas =

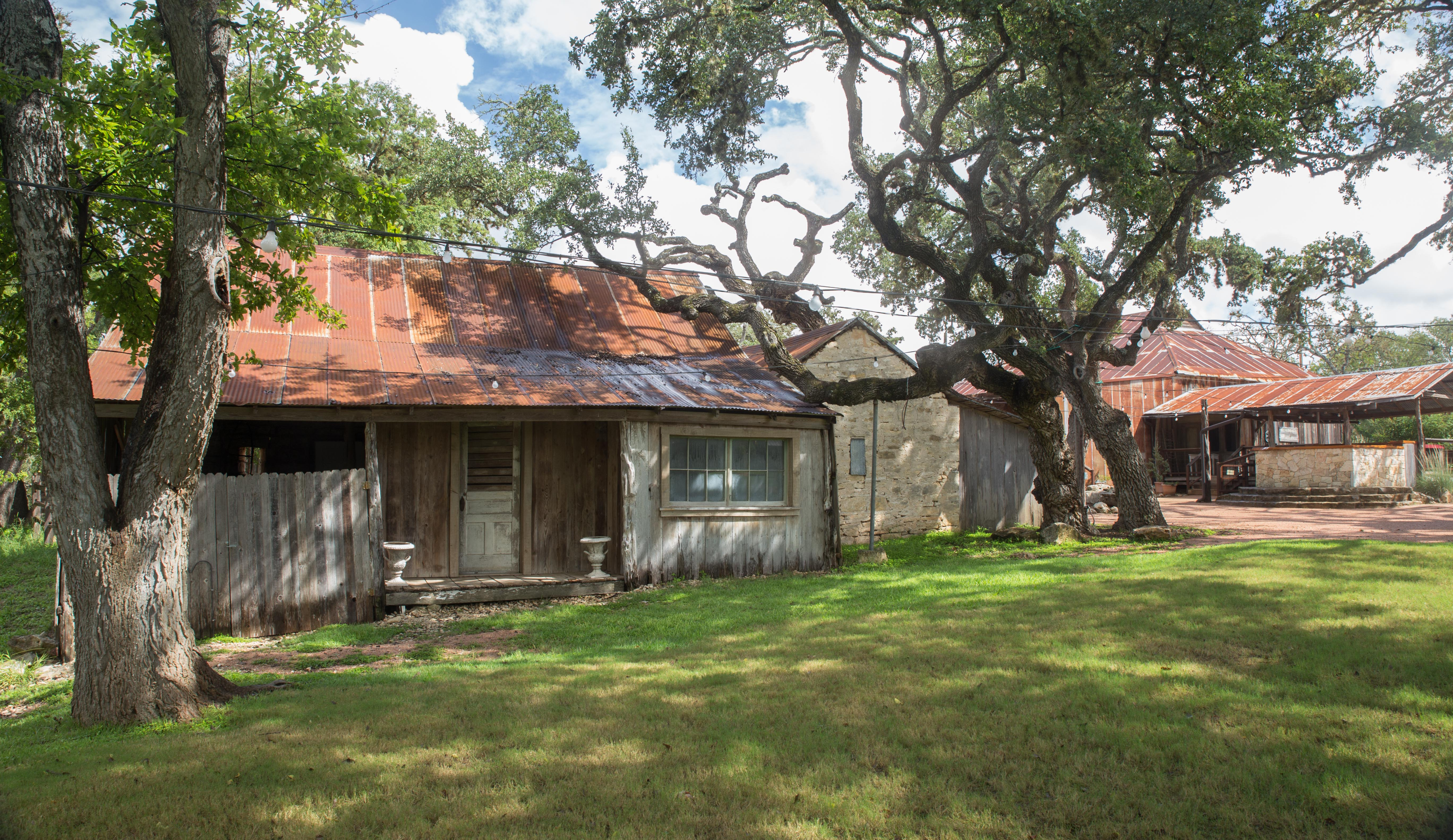

- Location in Texas and the United States Sisterdale (the United States)
- Coordinates: 29°58′23″N 98°43′15″W
- Country: United States
- State: Texas
- County: Kendall
- Elevation: 1,280 ft (390 m)
- Time zone: UTC-6 (Central (CST))
  - Summer (DST): UTC-5 (CDT)
- ZIP code: 78006 (Boerne)
- Area code: 830
- FIPS code: 48-68060
- GNIS feature ID: 1347179

Sisterdale is an unincorporated farming and ranching community established in 1847 and located 13 miles (21 km) north of Boerne in Kendall County, in the U.S. state of Texas. The community is located in the valley of Sister Creek. The elevation is 1,280 feet (390 m).

== Community ==
Sisterdale was settled in 1847 by German surveyor and free thinker Nicolaus Zink. Originally part of Comal County, Sisterdale became part of Kendall County when the latter was formed in 1862.

Among the settlers were German pioneers Fritz and Betty Holekamp, geographer Ernst Kapp; Anhalt Premier progeny Baron Ottomar von Behr; journalist Carl Adolph Douai; August Siemering who later founded the San Antonio Express News; author, journalist and diplomat Julius Fröbel; future Wall Street financial wizard Gustav Theissen; and Edgar von Westphalen, brother to Jenny von Westphalen who was married to Karl Marx.

The first child born in Sisterdale (and in Kendall County) was Julius Holekamp on June 10, 1849, to Fritz and Betty Holekamp.

One notable early colonist was Edward Degener, future Republican congressman from Texas during the Reconstruction era. Degener's sons Hugo and Hilmar died during the American Civil War in the Nueces massacre. To honor their memory, Degener along with Eduard Steves and William Heuermann purchased land for the establishment of the German-language Treue der Union Monument, which was built in 1866 and listed on the National Register of Historic Places in 1978.

Also among the settlers was Julius Dresel (or Dressel), a member of the German Chambers of Deputies, who was the first to plant a Sisterdale vineyard. His brother Emil Dresel and partner Jacob Gundlach later established the Rhein Farm Vineyard in Sonoma, California. Julius later moved to San Antonio. Upon the death of brother Emil, who bequeathed Julius his share of the Sonoma vineyard, Julius moved his family to California.

The community received a post office in 1851, and Ottomar W. Behr was the first postmaster.

Sisterdale eventually had a school house, a gas station-garage, a general store, a cotton gin, and a factory for making cypress shingles. The old 1885 cotton gin in Sisterdale has been restored and is today home to Sister Creek Vineyards.

== Historical population ==
Historical population
Census	Pop.	Note	%±
1880	150		—
1910	26		—
1920	50		92.3%
1970	63		—
1980	100		58.7%
1990	60		−40.0%
2000	25		−58.3%
2010	110		340.0%

Source: Texas Escapes

== Free thinkers ==
Sisterdale was one of the Latin Settlements, resulting from the Revolutions of 1848 in the German states. Those who came were Forty-Eighters, intellectual liberal abolitionists who enjoyed conversing in Latin and believed in utopian ideals that guaranteed basic human rights to all. They reveled in passionate conversations about literature, music and philosophy.

The free thinkers petitioned the Texas Legislature in 1853 for a charter to operate a German-English college to be built at Sisterdale, but the petition did not come to fruition.

Irene Marschall King, granddaughter of John O. Meusebach, remembered how her grandfather enjoyed the intellectual stimulation of visits to Sisterdale, where a man of his aristocratic background could relate to such cultured free thought discourse, and where the air filled with concert music, singing, dancing and an ambience of general Gemütlichkeit.

In 1853, August Siemering was elected secretary, and Ernst Kapp the president, of the freethinker abolitionist organization Der Freie Verein (The Free Society), which called for a meeting of abolitionist German Texans in conjunction with the May 14, 1854, Staats-Saengerfest (State Singing Festival) in San Antonio. Wilhelm Victor Keidel was elected vice president of the convention, which adopted a political, social and religious platform, including:

1) Equal pay for equal work; 2) Direct election of the President of the United States; 3) Abolition of capital punishment; 4) Slavery is an evil, the abolition of which is a requirement of democratic principles...; 5) Free schools – including universities – supported by the state, without religious influence; and 6) Total separation of church and state.

One of the most tragic episodes in the history of Kendall County happened in 1862 after Texas joined the Confederacy. The Confederacy considered the free thinkers of Sisterdale and like communities to be a threat. A number of Kendall County Germans became conscientious objectors to the military draft. Confederate authorities reacted by imposing martial law on central Texas. 61 conscientious objectors attempted to flee to Mexico. Confederate irregular James Duff and his Duff's Partisan Rangers pursued them. At the Nueces River, 34 were killed, and some executed after being taken prisoner. In 1866, Kendall County erected the Treue der Union Monument ("Loyalty to the Union") monument dedicated to the German Texans slain at the Nueces massacre.

== Darmstadt Society of Forty ==
Some of the early settlers in Sisterdale migrated from the collapsed Fisher–Miller Land Grant experimental colonies of the Darmstadt Society of Forty.

== Sisterdale Valley District ==
- Sisterdale Valley District
- U.S. National Register of Historic Places
- U.S. Historic district
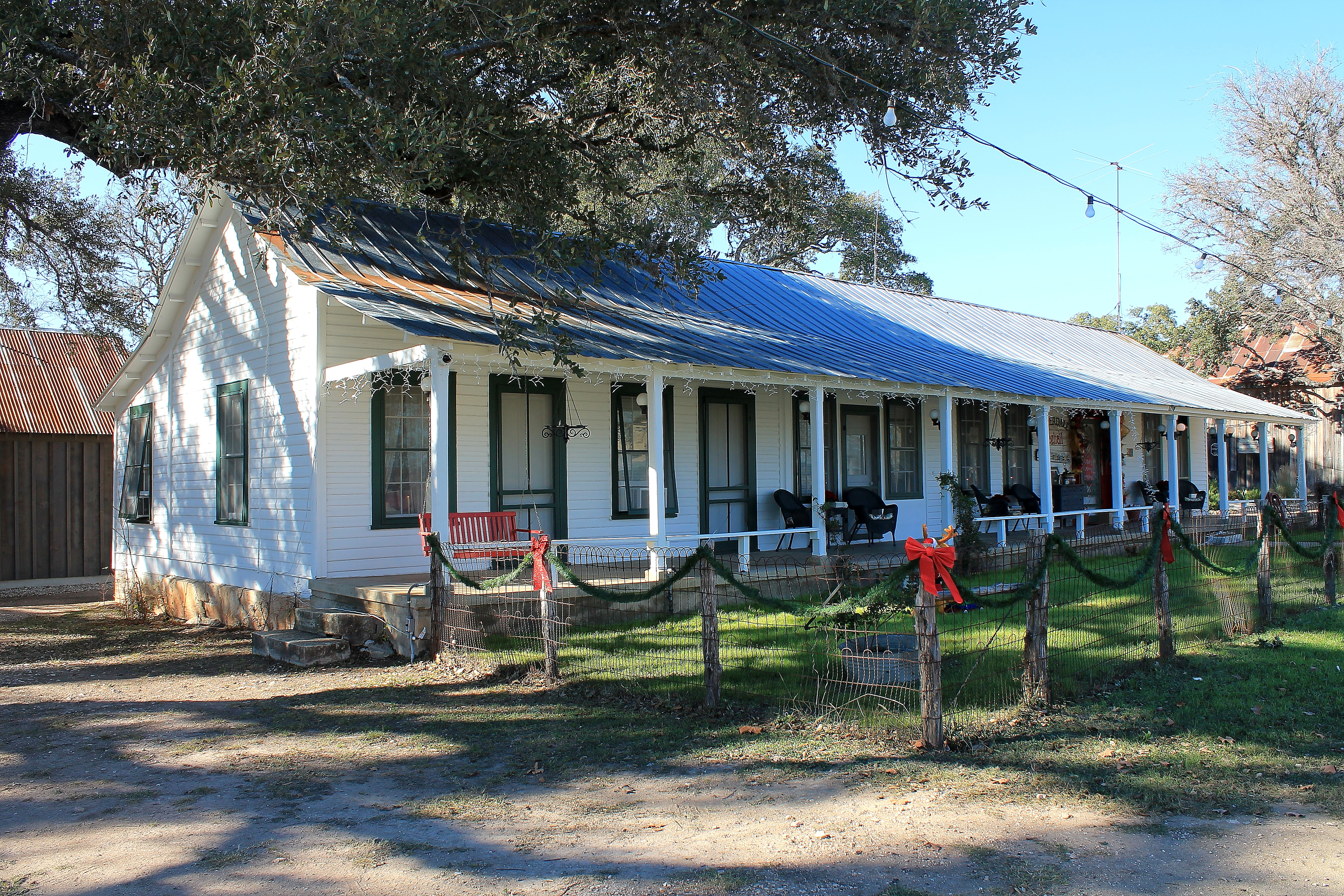
- Sisterdale Bed and Breakfast
- Location: FM 1376, Sisterdale, Texas
- Area: 2,893 acres (1,171 ha)
- NRHP reference No.: 75001996
- Added to NRHP: January 8, 1975

The Sisterdale Valley District is a 2,893-acre (1,171 ha) historic district in Sisterdale, Texas that was listed on the U.S. National Register of Historic Places in 1975. It included 15 contributing buildings and six other contributing structures. The historic buildings include an 1890s dance hall.

Various sources discuss Sisterdale.

== Photo gallery ==
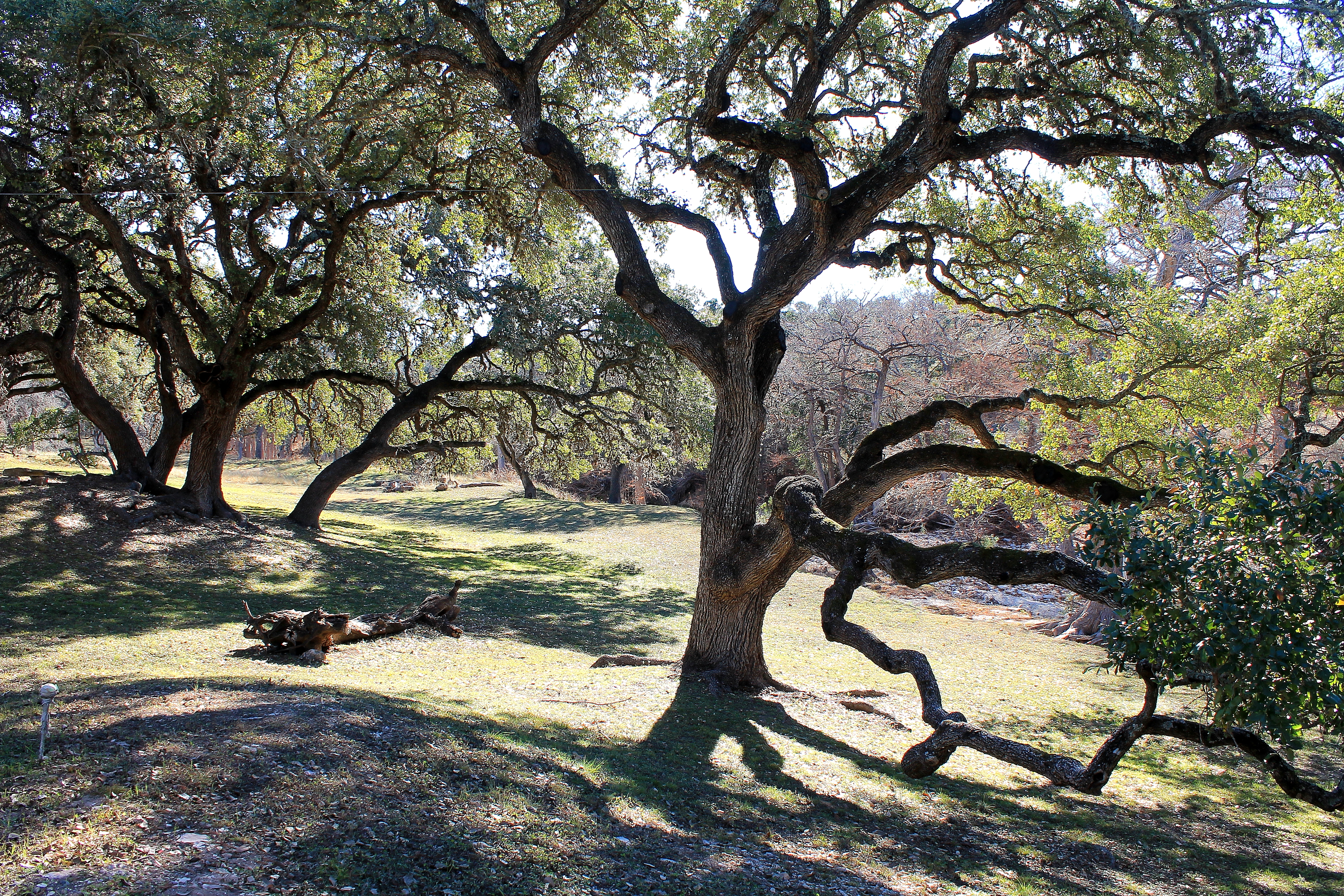
Grounds of the Sisterdale Dance Hall & Opera House

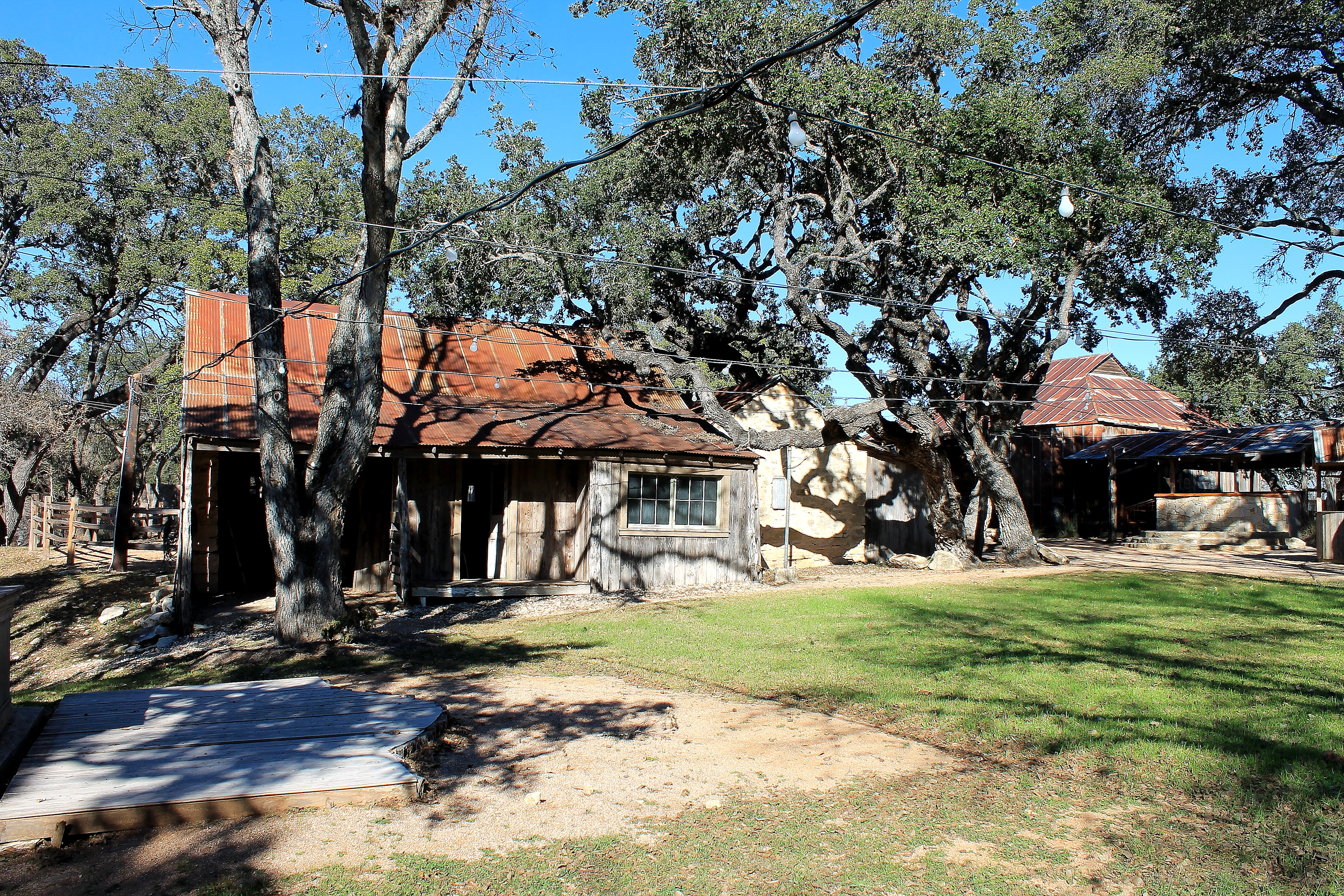
Original Settler Cabin Circa 1859

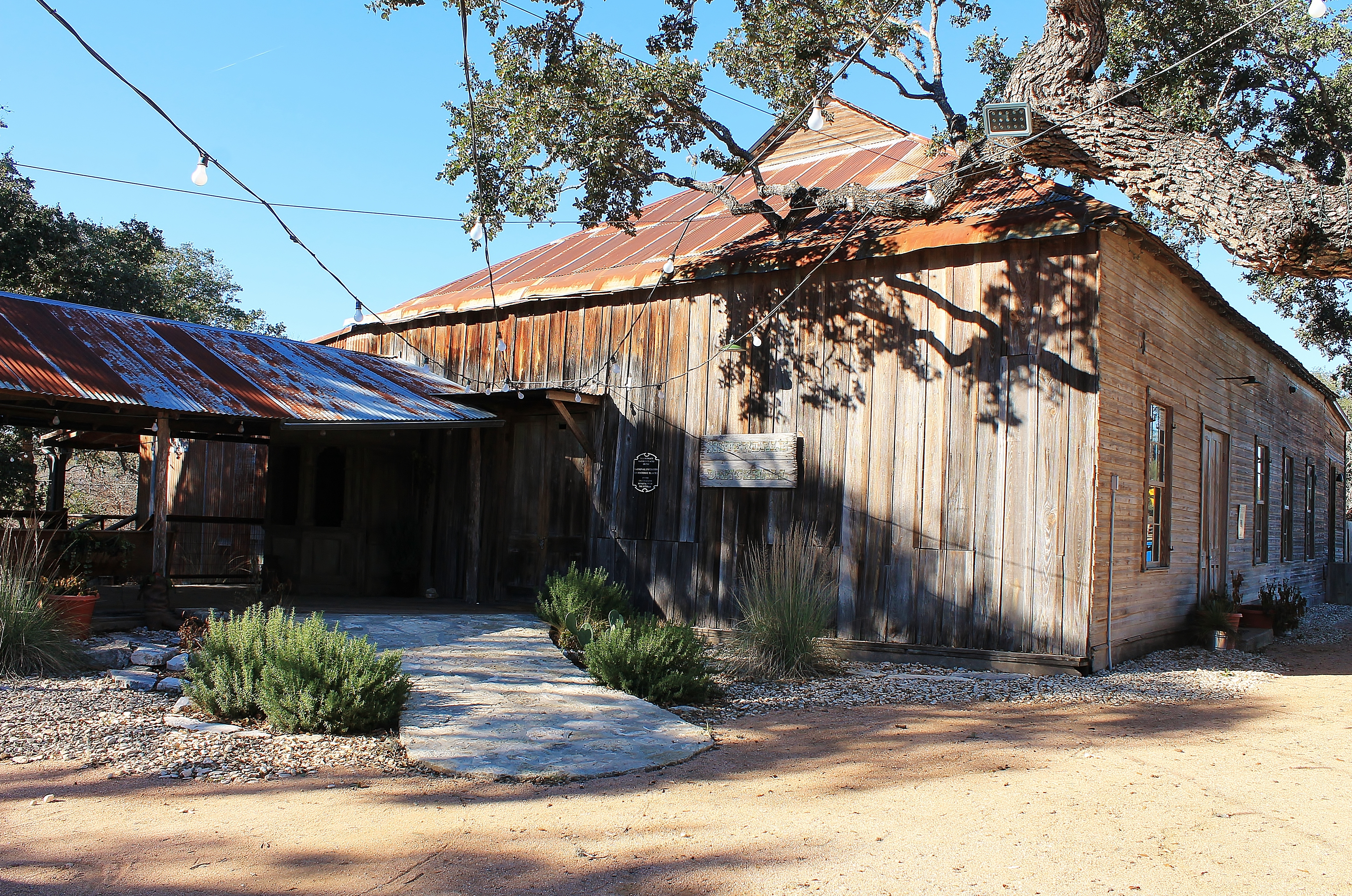
Sisterdale Dance Hall & Opera House

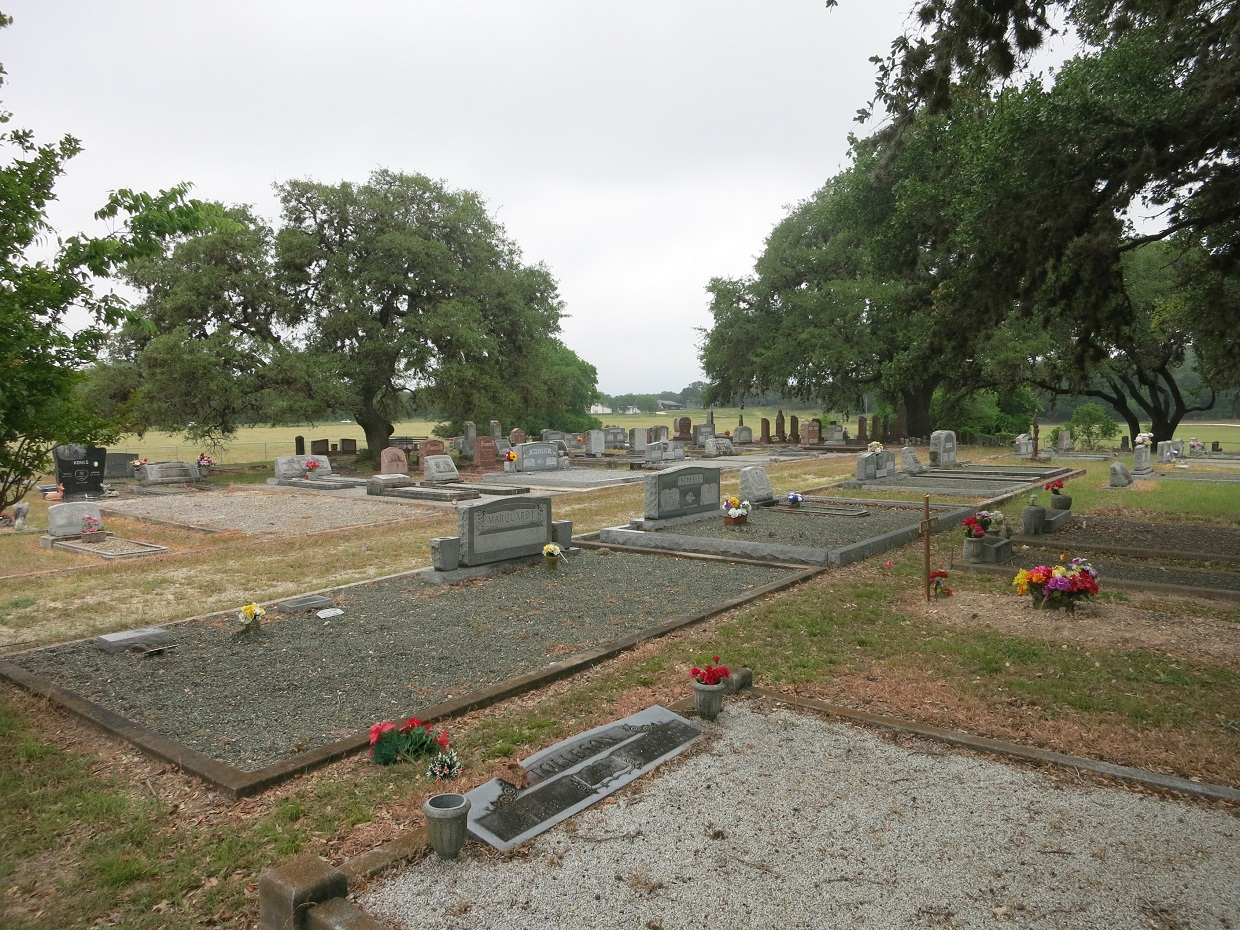
Sisterdale Cemetery at RM 473 and 1376

== See also ==
- Fredericksburg, Texas
- German Texan
- Grapetown, Texas
- Crabapple, Texas
- Texas Hill Country
- National Register of Historic Places listings in Kendall County, Texas
