= Betty Holekamp =

German colonist and pioneer in Texas

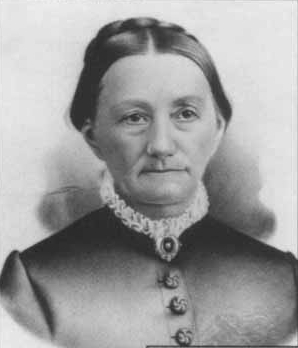
- Born: Betty Wilhelmine Abbenthern; 1826; Kingdom of Hannover, German Confederation
- Died: 1902 (aged 75–76); Comfort, Texas
- Spouse: Georg Friedrich "Fritz" Holekamp (1812–1862) (m. 1844–1862)

Betty Holekamp (1826–1902) was a German colonist and pioneer in Texas. She is recognized for several "firsts" as a Texas pioneer, such as being the first to sew an American flag upon Texas's acceptance into the Union, and thus is known as the Betsy Ross of Texas. She was also among the first residents in four Texas Hill Country communities: New Braunfels, Fredericksburg, Sisterdale, and Comfort.

== Life in Germany ==
Betty Holekamp was born Betty Wilhelmine Abbenthern in the Kingdom of Hannover. She was the daughter of Henry Christian Abbethern, who was the ministerial accountant to King Ernest Augustus of Hannover, and she grew up in the household of the king. She was schooled with the king's daughter and was being trained to be a governess.

While playing music together at court gatherings, she met Georg Friedrich "Fritz" Holekamp (1812–1862), the son of a wealthy Hannover builder and an educated royal architect and musician. Once engaged, the couple learned of opportunities in Texas from Prince Carl of Solms-Braunfels. They wed in March 1844. On September 16, 1844, Fritz Holekamp entered into a contract with the German Immigration Company, and soon thereafter the couple boarded the ship Johann Dethard, arriving at Galveston and then at Indianola in November 1844.

== Settlement of the Texas Hill Country ==
=== New Braunfels ===
Led by Prince Solms, the 228 immigrants from the Johann Dethard proceeded overland from Indianola to the site chosen to be the first German settlement in Texas, New Braunfels. (Prince Carl of Solms-Braunfels later was found to have purposely chose the more remote and difficult route from Indianola, instead of from Galveston, to isolate the colonists from the local Texans.) Upon reaching the Guadalupe River, the pioneers found the river too high to cross due to the winter rains. Prince Solms, perhaps wishing to impress the others with his bravado, plunged into the raging waters and crossed the swollen river on horseback. Not to be outdone by anyone, Betty Holekamp immediately followed and successfully crossed the river to the astonishment of her fellow colonists and perhaps to the chagrin of the prince. Thus, Betty Holekamp is known as the first white woman to cross the Guadalupe on horseback.

Flag style sewn by Holekamp

When word first broke of Texas being admitted to the Union in 1845, Betty Holekamp gathered pieces of cloth from her home and from her neighbors and used them to sew a 6-by-3-foot (1.83 by 0.91 m) United States flag (with a lone star in the field of blue) that was unfurled and flown in the town square of New Braunfels. This was the first American flag flown in New Braunfels, and believed to be the first flown in Texas. The sewing of that flag was a bold political statement for the time. Prince Solms, having come from the world of European aristocracy, governed New Braunfels as a king, but the flying of the flag symbolized to the prince and to the populus that Texas was now part of a free and democratic nation.

=== Fredericksburg ===
After about two years in New Braunfels, the Holekamps moved and were among the first residents of Fredericksburg. On January 18, 1847, Fritz Holekamp received 320 acres (130 ha) of land just outside Fredericksburg from the Fisher–Miller Land Grant colonization. He added his signature to the December 15, 1847 List of Petitioners to Create Gillespie County.

=== Sisterdale ===
After two years outside Fredericksburg, the Holekamps purchased 55 acres (22 ha) in Sisterdale from Nicolaus Zink and became the third family to settle in the new German colony. There, Betty Holekamp gave birth to her second son, Julius, who was born on June 10, 1849, making him the first white child born in Kendall County. While in Sisterdale, Betty Holekamp became an expert marksman who was known to shoot as well as any of the men. She hunted bear and panthers and suffered regular raids from Indians, who became adept at stealing food from settlers.

=== Comfort ===
After briefly living in San Antonio, the Holekamp family settled in Comfort in 1854. Fritz Holekamp worked with surveyor Ernst Altgelt in the laying out and founding of the city of Comfort. The Holekamps built the first house in the town (Fritz and his son George started construction before Comfort was officially founded) and Fritz was in charge of Comfort's cannon.

When the American Civil War started, Fritz Holekamp joined the Confederacy at the rank of captain working as a surgeon because he had some medical training in Germany. Fritz Holekamp may have joined the army in exchange for sparing his teenaged sons from the draft. In seeming contrast to the Holekamps, most German immigrants from the Texas Hill Country were supporters of the Union. (Many Comfort area residents were victims of the Nueces Massacre and the Treue der Union Monument is located in Comfort.) Fritz Holekamp was killed in battle in 1862.

Widowed, Betty Holekamp took in boarders and opened a sewing and washing business to provide for her seven children (her son, Ernest, later became the first mayor of Junction, Texas). Remaining in Comfort, she never remarried and outlived her husband by 40 years.

== See also ==
- Adelsverein
- German Texan
