= Latium, Texas =

Latium
- Unincorporated community
- Location within Texas
- Coordinates: 30°04′50″N 96°33′38″W
- Country: United States
- State: Texas
- County: Washington County
- Settled: mid-1800s
- Elevation: 377 ft (115 m)

Population (2000)
  - Total: 30
- Time zone: UTC−06:00 (CST)
  - Summer (DST): UTC−05:00 (CDT)
- GNIS feature ID: 1378567

Latium (pronounced "Latcham" or "Lotzyum"), is an unincorporated community in Washington County, Texas, United States. According to the Handbook of Texas, the community had a population of 30 in 2000. It is located within the Greater Houston metropolitan area.

== History ==
It was one of five Latin colonies established in Texas after 1848 by political refugees from Germany. Early German immigrants included civil engineer Hermann Rogalla von Bieberstein, who eventually became a well-known Texas surveyor and artist Rudolph Melchior, who adorned the Winedale Inn. In 1868, Czechs landed in Latium. In 1873, Reverend Josef Chromik established a mission among Catholic Czech immigrants in Texas. A post office opened in 1884 and was shut down in 1907. 50 people were living in Latium in 1892. The Sacred Heart Catholic Church was constructed in 1918 by Czechs, who subsequently dominated the community; services were still held there until the late 1980s. For the majority of the 20th century, Latium acted as a supply hub for the surrounding agricultural region. Thirty people were living there, most of whom were Czech with a small number of Germans. At the time, Latium had a general store that also acted as a community center, a Catholic church, a Czech Catholic cemetery, a gas station, and a volunteer fire department. The population was still 30 in 2000.

It was also a German Freethinking community.

== Geography ==
Latium is located on Farm to Market Road 389 near Pond Creek, 12 mi (19 km) southwest of Brenham, 3.4 mi (5.5 km) south of Greenvine, and 11 mi (18 km) east of Round Top in the southwestern corner of Washington County.

== Education ==
Latium had its own school from 1885 to 1948. Today, the community is served by the Brenham Independent School District.
