= Friedrich Kapp =

German-American lawyer, writer and politician

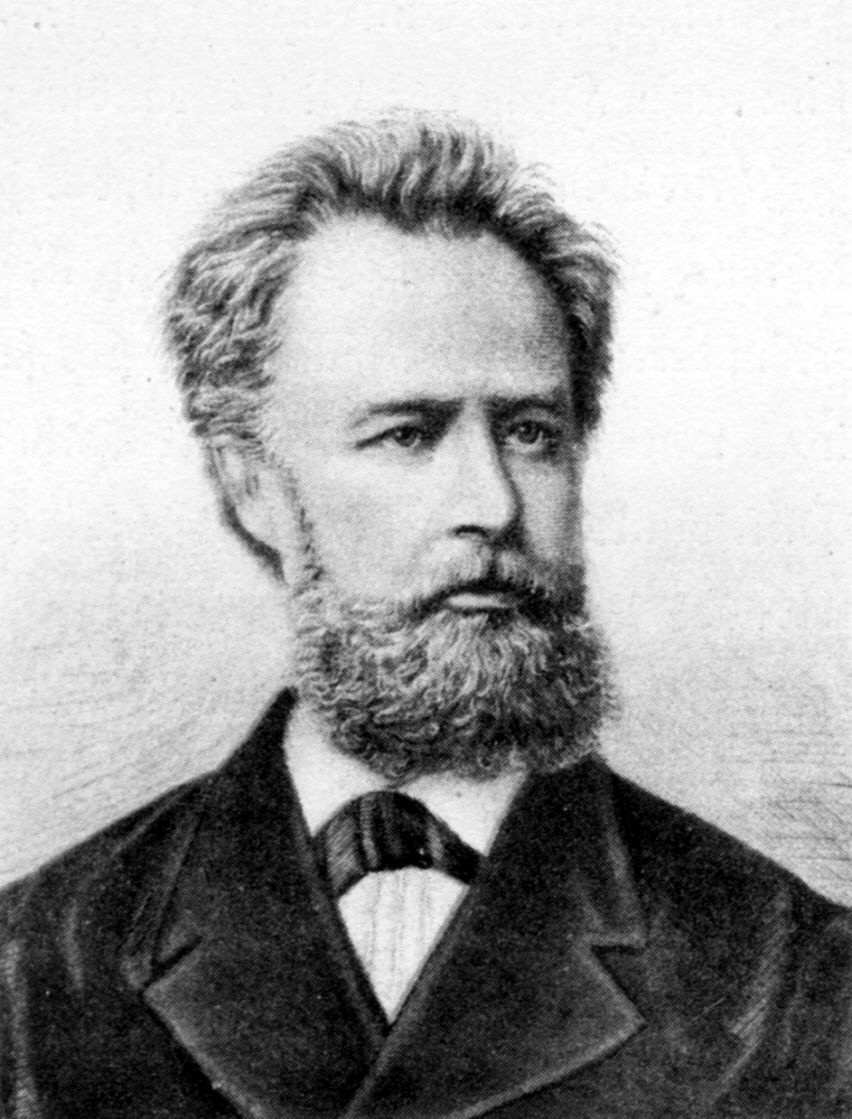
- Friedrich Kapp (1824–1884); lithograph, 1880
- Born: April 13, 1824; Hamm, German Confederation
- Died: October 27, 1884 (aged 60); Berlin, Germany
- Occupations: lawyer, writer, politician
- Writing career
- Pen name: Kapp

Friedrich Kapp (13 April 1824 – 27 October 1884) was a German-American lawyer, writer, and politician. He was an outspoken opponent of Germany's colonization fervor during his time as a National Liberal Reichstag deputy. This was exemplified in his speech to the annual Congress of German Economists. Kapp stressed both the unprofitability of colonies and their negative impact on Anglo-German relations.

== Biography ==
=== Family life ===
Kapp was born in Hamm, Province of Westphalia, as the son of the Gymnasialdirektor Friedrich Kapp (1792–1866). He was the nephew of educator and philosopher Ernst Kapp (1801–1896). His father, Friedrich Christian Georg Kapp (1798–1874), was a teacher and politician who took an active part in the revolutionary events in Westphalia in 1848.

In New York, he married Luise Engels, the daughter of General Friedrich Ludwig C. Engels (1790–1855), commander of Cologne (1847–1855). His son, Wolfgang Kapp (1858–1922), was the nominal leader of the Kapp Putsch.

=== Education in Heidelberg ===
Kapp received his Abitur from Gymnasium “Hammonense”, the same educational institution where his father held the position of principal. Between 1842 and 1844, Kapp studied law and philosophy at the University of Heidelberg. There, at his uncle Christian Kapp's (1798–1874) house, he met the philosopher Ludwig Feuerbach. Not only did they become close friends; Feuerbach's criticism of religion, which also strongly influenced Karl Marx, had a great impact on Kapp's attitude towards life as well. Other acquaintances from his time as a student were Ludwig Bamberger (1823–1899), who would later become a banker, the author Berthold Auerbach (1812–1882) of Heidelberg and the poet Bettina von Arnim (1785–1859) of Berlin. From 1844 on, Kapp studied at the University of Berlin and voluntarily served in the army for one year. In Berlin, he was already working as a journalist for the utopian socialist magazine called "Westfälisches Dampfboot" (Westfalian Steamboat).

=== Judge in Hamm ===
In 1845, he returned to his hometown Hamm to work as an intern at the highest court of appeals in Westfalia and stayed there until 1848. In Hamm, he founded a reading circle where "leftwing Hegelian intellectuals read foreign newspapers, which were not affected by Prussian censorship, as well as the texts of the Young Hegelians, and German and West European socialists," according to historian Hans-Ulrich Wehler.

During his time at the High Court of Appeal in Hamm, Kapp was anything but popular: The court's president could only grant him access to the assessor's exam under certain conditions.

=== Journalist in Frankfurt ===
The uprisings of March 1848 in Germany prompted Kapp to go to Frankfurt to work as a journalist. His uncle, Christian Kapp, had become a member of the National Assembly in St. Paul's Church over the intervening years. In Frankfurt, Kapp was also politically involved by working for the democratic-republican left. He became the first secretary of the Frankfurt Parliament.

Kapp worked as a political journalist in Frankfurt, but due to his involvement in the September Rebellion he had to flee to Brussels. There he worked as a private teacher for the son of Russian writer Alexander Herzen.

=== Paris, Geneva and departure for the United States ===
From Brussels, he went to Paris where he continued to work for Herzen and translated two of his employer's books. In July 1849, the French police forced Herzen and Kapp to leave Paris. Both of them went to Geneva, where Kapp ran into an acquaintance of his, Ludwig Bamberger. In 1846 Kapp had first thought about emigrating to the United States, but not until he arrived in Geneva did he make the final decision to leave. He reached New York City in March 1850. Later, he married his fiancée Luise Engels, who had followed him to the United States soon afterwards.

=== Journalist in New York ===
In New York, Kapp joined the law firm of Zitz, Kapp and Froebel. Despite early successes, he found he had no liking for the law. Starting in 1852, Kapp worked as a journalist for the newly founded Atlantic Studies. Their aim was to correct overly enthusiastic reports on the U.S. being circulated in Germany and also to show the darker side of American reality. Having become an American citizen in 1855, he was a lawyer until 1870 and worked as a foreign correspondent for the "Kölnische Zeitung", a newspaper in Cologne, Germany. He also wrote for the early numbers of the Nation of New York. From 1855, he was co-publisher of the New Yorker Abend-Zeitung, a German newspaper in New York, and wrote several books about this flourishing country and the life of Germans in the United States. In politics, he associated with the Whigs.

In contrast to many other German-Americans, however, he always kept strong ties to his homeland. His loyalty towards Germany and his belief in a unified German state not only continued to dominate his own life but also the upbringing of his son Wolfgang.

=== Activities against slavery in Florida ===
In 1856, Kapp bought a house in Mansfield Square which was to become a popular location where the Germans of New York met to discuss literature and politics. After visiting Florida in 1852, he became a stout opponent of slavery in the southern states (abolitionism). Thus, in 1854, he not only wrote a book on the history of slavery in the United States, but even became a member of the Republican Party. In 1856 and in 1860 he actively campaigned for this party in presidential elections. In 1860, he was even nominated as an elector for Abraham Lincoln. Alongside Carl Schurz, he was one of the most prominent activists to win German-Americans over to the Union cause. In 1867, he became a member of the New York Board of Immigration. It was a position he held until he returned to Germany in 1870.

=== Writing biographies of German immigrants in the U.S. ===
As a political writer he can be regarded as a pioneer of German-American historical science. He described the effects of German immigration on both countries, wrote the biographies of the generals Friedrich Wilhelm von Steuben (1858) and Johann de Kalb (1862), and explored various American topics from a German point of view. Being very aware of his German identity, he wanted to show Americans the significance of German influence on the US. In a similar manner, he tried to convince his home country of its capability to form a unified German nation, using the achievements of German emigrants as a role model. In 1855, he described the fairly poor living conditions of his fellow Germans in the Texan colony of the "Mainzer Adelsverein". While still in the United States, the University of Bonn conferred an honorary degree of philosophy on him on 4 August 1868.

=== City representative of Berlin ===
After a general amnesty had been granted to political opponents, Kapp returned to Germany in April 1870 at the urging of German friends. As early as 21 October of that year he had become a Prussian citizen again. As such he was quickly able to become a city representative of Berlin in Otto von Bismarck's German Empire in 1871/1872. From 1872 to 1877 and from 1881 to his death he was a Member of Parliament for the National Liberal Party in the German Reichstag. Apart from that he was also a representative of the regional parliament of Prussia from 1874 to 1877. In Berlin he also continued his work as a political writer.

As Kapp had always been in favor of a German Free State, he now pushed for a vigorous policy of settlement in the East in order to stop Germans from emigrating. At the same time he was engaged in developing uniform regulations for the consular system as well as for all kinds of emigration questions. His book Aus und über Amerika (Out of and about America) was published in Berlin in 1876. Its realism and candid opinions earned it unfavorable reviews in the United States.

=== Writing for the history of the German book trade ===
Fellow party member and Member of Parliament Eduard Brockhaus encouraged Kapp to write a book on the history of the German book trade ("Geschichte des deutschen Buchhandels"). This was a very difficult task for Kapp, as it was not his area of expertise and there were insufficient published sources at the time. Therefore, Kapp first had to do intensive research in archives. To this end, Kapp visited the Plantin-Moretus Museum in Antwerp in 1884, where he was able to study the "Grand Livre de Francfort", an important source about the book trade in general as well as the Frankfurt Book Fair. When Kapp died in Berlin later that year, he had just finished four chapters and outlined several others. Nevertheless, he was mentioned as author of the first of a total of four volumes.

== Works ==
- Die Sklavenfrage in den Vereinigten Staaten (The slavery question in the United States; Göttingen, 1854)
- Leben des amerikanischen Generals Friedrich Wilhelm von Steuben (Life of American General Friedrich Wilhelm von Steuben; Berlin, 1858; English ed., New York, 1859)
- Geschichte der Sklaverei in den Vereinigten Staaten (History of slavery in the United States; Hamburg, 1860)
- Leben des amerikanischen Generals Johann Kalb (Life of American General Johann Kalb; Stuttgart, 1862; English ed., New York, 1870)
- Friedrich Kapp (1886–1913). Geschichte des Deutschen Buchhandels. Leipzig.
- Der Soldatenhandel deutscher Fürsten nach Amerika (The trade in soldiers for America by German princes; Berlin, 1864; 2d revised and enlarged ed., 1874)
- Geschichte der deutschen Auswanderung in Amerika (History of German emigration to America; vol. i., Leipzig, 1868)
- On Immigration and the Commission of Emigration (1870)
- Friedrich der Grosse und die Vereinigten Staaten von Amerika (Frederick the Great and the United States of America; 1871)
