= Franz Heinrich Zitz =

German attorney (1803–1877)

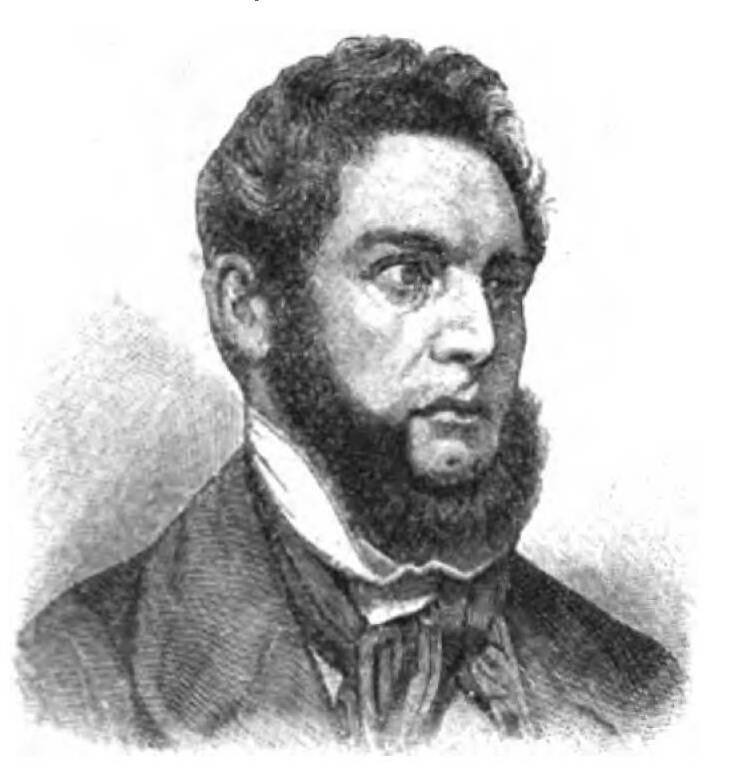
- A sketch of Zits from Die Gartenlaube from 1898

Member of the Frankfurt National Assembly
- In office 1848–1849

Member of the Vorparlament
- In office 1848–1848

Personal details
- Born: 18 November 1803 Mainz, Rhineland-Palatinate
- Died: 30 April 1877 (aged 73) Munich, Kingdom of Bavaria
- Spouse: Kathinka Zitz-Halein
- Education: University of Göttingen; University of Giessen
- Occupation: Lawyer, politician, revolutionary

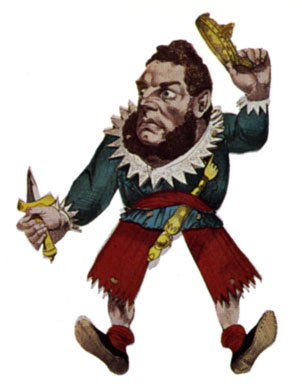
Parliamentarian Zitz caricatured as a Jumping Jack

Dr. Franz Heinrich Zitz (18 November 1803 in Mainz – 30 April 1877) was a Mainz attorney, a member of the Frankfurt National Assembly, a Forty-eighter, and one of the primary rebel leaders of the Palatine uprising during the German revolutions of 1848–1849.

== Life ==
On June 3, 1837, he married the writer Katharina Theresa Halein, not completely of his own free will, but under threat of suicide. They lived together two years and remained married for the rest of their lives. As a member of the Frankfurt parliament, Franz played a respected role on the far left, and as the head of the militia in Mainz he was highly esteemed and trusted by the people of that town. He sported a remarkably full and unkempt beard during the 1849 uprising, and when it failed, toward the end of that year, he emigrated to the United States, settling in New York as a notary, a partner in the firm Kapp, Zitz, and Fröbel. When amnesty was offered, he returned to Europe and died in Munich.
