= Wolfgang Kapp =

German political activist (1858–1922)

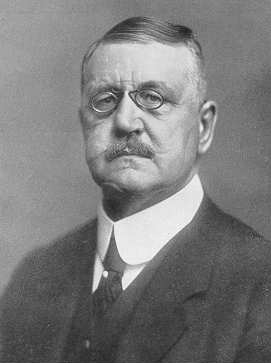
- Wolfgang Kapp

Member of the Reichstag for Gumbinnen 2, East Prussia
- In office 2 February 1918 – 9 November 1918
- Preceded by: Fritz Gottschalk
- Succeeded by: Constituency abolished

Personal details
- Born: 24 July 1858 New York City, New York, United States
- Died: 12 June 1922 (aged 63) Klinikum St. Georg, Leipzig, Weimar Republic
- Party: German Fatherland Party; German National People's Party
- Spouse: Margarete Rosenow
- Children: 3
- Education: Eberhard Karls University of Tübingen; Georg-August University of Göttingen
- Occupation: Civil servant, politician
- Profession: Lawyer

Wolfgang Kapp (24 July 1858 – 12 June 1922) was a German conservative and nationalist political activist who is best known for his involvement in the eponymous 1920 Kapp Putsch. He spent most of his career working for the Prussian Ministry of Finance and then as director of the Agricultural Credit Institute in East Prussia. During World War I, Kapp was a vocal annexationist and critic of the government's policies, which he saw as not aggressive enough. He founded the German Fatherland Party alongside grand admiral Alfred von Tirpitz; it became the largest party on the German political right. His strong dislike of parliamentary government and the Weimar Republic led him to take a leading role in the 1920 putsch that bears his name. Following the putsch's failure to overthrow the German government, Kapp went into exile in Sweden. He returned to Germany in late 1921 to appear in court, but died while under medical care before he could testify.

== Early life ==
Kapp was born in New York City, where his father Friedrich Kapp, a political activist and later Reichstag delegate for the National Liberal Party, had settled after the failed European revolutions of 1848. In 1870, the family returned to Germany, and Kapp's schooling continued in Berlin at the Friedrich Wilhelm Gymnasium. Wolfgang Kapp married Margarete Rosenow in 1884; the couple had three children. Through his wife's family, Kapp acquired connections with politically conservative elements. He studied law at the Eberhard Karls University of Tübingen and the Georg-August University of Göttingen, where he became a member of the student organization Corps Hannovera Göttingen. In 1886, he completed his doctorate in law and was appointed to a position in the Prussian Ministry of Finance the same year.

In 1907, through the intercession of his friend Elard von Oldenburg-Januschau, an influential Junker from East Prussia, Kapp took over the lucrative position of director of the East Prussian Agricultural Credit Institute, a post he held until March 1920. He successfully lobbied for the agricultural workers' movement, peasant settlement and agricultural debt relief, and against strong opposition he founded a non-profit public life insurance company. In 1912 he was elected to the supervisory board of Deutsche Bank. He was also an honorary doctor of the University of Königsberg.

== Political activist ==
During World War I, Kapp became widely known among the German population as one of the most high-profile advocates of far-reaching German war goals. He called for extensive annexations and high reparations payments from the nations of the Triple Entente. He considered it indispensable that occupied Belgium be permanently linked to the German Empire militarily, economically and politically, that German naval bases be established on the coast of Flanders and that vigorous action be taken against Great Britain.

As a vocal advocate of unrestricted submarine warfare, Kapp came into conflict with Chancellor Theobald von Bethmann Hollweg, who sought to prevent it out of fear that it would lead to America entering the war. A pamphlet of Kapp's published in the early summer of 1916 entitled "The National Circles and the Chancellor" (Die Nationalen Kreise und der Reichskanzler) criticised German foreign and domestic policy under Bethmann Hollweg. The pamphlet evoked an indignant reply from Bethmann Hollweg in the Reichstag in which he spoke of "loathsome abuse and slanders".

In reaction to the Reichstag Peace Resolution of 1917, Kapp and Grand Admiral Alfred von Tirpitz founded the German Fatherland Party (Deutsche Vaterlandspartei), of which Kapp was briefly the chairman. Through a by-election, he became a member of the last Reichstag of the Empire on 2 February 1918 for a constituency in Gumbinnen, East Prussia. Kapp felt the defeat of the First World War as a national disgrace. He became a proponent of the stab-in-the-back myth, the belief that the German army had remained undefeated in the field and was stabbed in the back by Jews, Freemasons and communists at home. He joined the German National People's Party (DNVP) in 1919 and participated in the anti-republican National Union (Nationale Vereinigung). The members, which included General Erich Ludendorff, Colonel Max Bauer and Captain Waldemar Pabst, were the core group behind the Kapp Putsch that attempted to overthrow the Weimar Republic.

== Putsch ==
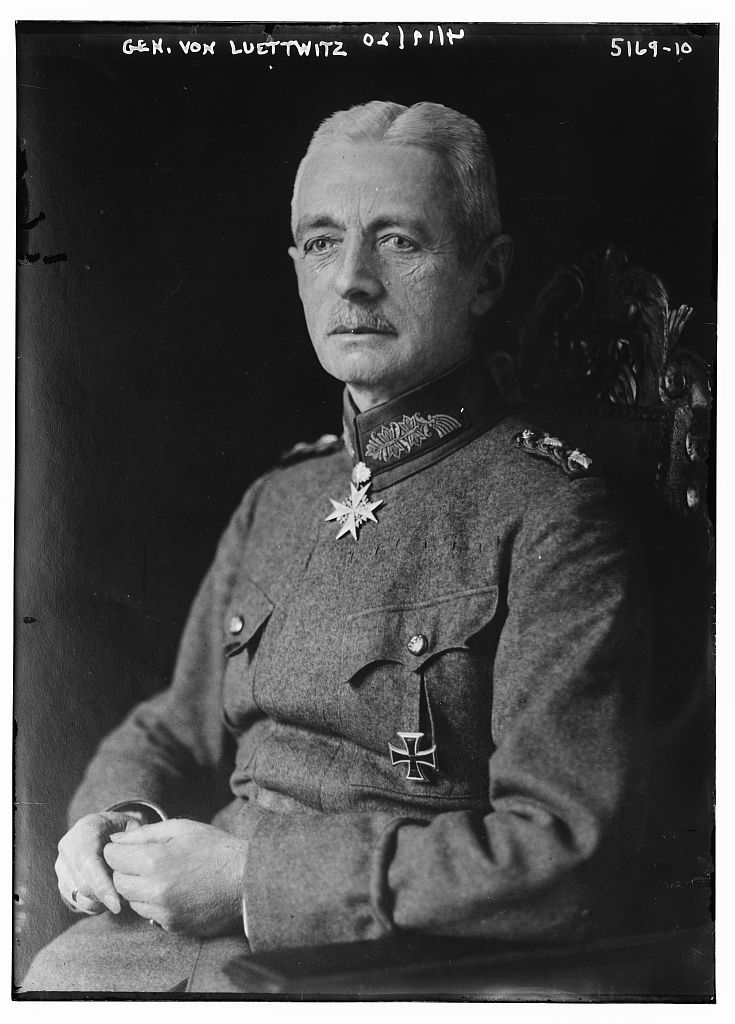
General Walther von Lüttwitz, who initiated the Kapp Putsch

On 10 March 1920, General Walther von Lüttwitz decided to stage a coup after Reichswehr Minister Gustav Noske relieved him of the command of several Reichswehr divisions. Kapp, who was in Berlin with a delegation from East Prussia, met with Lüttwitz to help plan the coup. On 13 March, the Marinebrigade Ehrhardt, a large Freikorps unit, was able to take control of Berlin's government quarter after the cabinet of Gustav Bauer and other leading officials fled the city. Kapp declared the government deposed, the Weimar National Assembly and the Prussian government dissolved, then named himself German chancellor and minister president of Prussia and Lüttwitz Reichswehr minister and commander-in-chief of the Reichswehr.

The putsch failed to take hold and was over by 18 March. It collapsed due to a general strike, lack of participation by the Reichswehr and the refusal of the majority of government officials to take orders from Kapp. He and Lüttwitz also had differing goals. Kapp wanted a complete overthrow of the government, while Lüttwitz had more limited and personal aims. Kapp handed his offices over to Lüttwitz on 17 March and fled to Sweden.

Lüttwitz went into exile in Hungary, then returned to Germany in 1924 after being granted amnesty.

== Exile and death ==
The German government did not ask for Kapp's extradition and he was granted permanent residency in Sweden. The trial against his co-conspirators in the putsch began in December 1921. After Dietrich von Jagow was sentenced to five years in prison, Kapp returned to Germany intending to claim his innocence and that the true criminals were those behind the German Revolution of 1918–1919. Before he could testify, a medical examination in the prison in Leipzig where he was being held found a tumor behind his right eye. He died of cancer shortly after the operation to remove it.
