= Latin Settlement =

German settlements in America

A Latin settlement (German: Lateinische Kolonie) is a community founded by German immigrants to the United States in the 1840s. Most of these were in Texas, but there were "Latin Settlements" in other states as well. These German intellectuals, so-called freethinkers and "Latinists" (German "Freidenker" and "Lateiner"), founded these communities in order to devote themselves to German literature, philosophy, science, classical music, and the Latin language.

== History ==
=== Texas ===
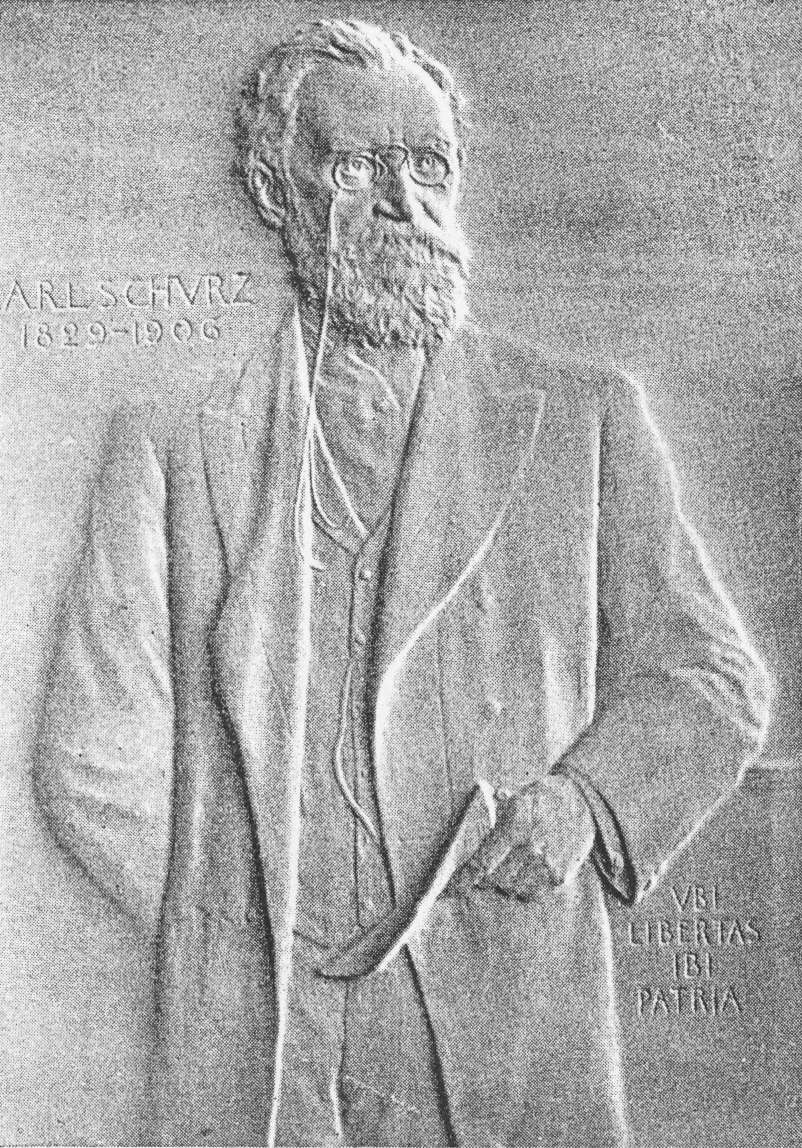
Ubi libertas, ibi patria inspired Carl Schurz's emigration to the United States in 1852. He was a Forty-Eighter and lived on a farm in Wisconsin for a time.

As a consequence of their political struggle in the German states during the revolutions of 1848, many professors and students saw no other option but to emigrate to North America in order to avoid being arrested and prosecuted or to implement their political ideal of a "free German nation" in the fairly new state of Texas in the United States, which at the time was still a growing nation itself, or both: "Ubi libertas, ibi patria", Latin for "Where there is freedom, there is my homeland, my country". These refugees of the post-1848 era later came to be called "Forty-Eighters", in the tradition of earlier political refugees being called "Dreißiger", which is German for "Thirtiers".

From as early as 1832–1833 onwards, German intellectuals had been emigrating to North America. Since many of them went to North America organized in groups and with the support of emigration organizations such as the Gießener Auswanderungsgesellschaft (i.e. the Emigration Association of Gießen) or the "Mainzer Adelsverein" (i.e. the Association of Noblemen of Mainz), most of them settled down in self-contained communities, which were called "Latin Settlements."

These settlements, however, were not destined to survive for very long. The settlers were young adventurers or classically educated intellectuals, so-called "Latinists" or "Latin Ones" (German "Lateiner"), sometimes both, but by no means farmers. It is therefore no wonder that most of them went to bigger cities like San Antonio or Houston after the Civil War and the phenomenon of "Latin Settlements" gradually disappeared.

One very telling description of the German settlers' ways of life at that time can be found online in an article of the Karl May foundation: Frederick Law Olmsted (1822–1903), a landscape architect and traveler in Texas, went to visit these Germans. He described them and their peculiarities. According to this article, they had valuable madonnas hanging on wooden walls, they drank coffee out of tin cups which they placed upon saucers of fine Dresdner porcelain, they played the piano and had trunks half filled with potatoes and half filled with books. After dinner, they would walk miles to meet in a log cabin to play music, to sing and to dance.

On his journey to Texas in 1867, German-American author Friedrich Kapp met a former university friend of his, who explained his situation to him thus: "I am not happy in the true sense of the word, but neither I am unhappy, for I live freely and without coercion. I do not depend on anything except on my oxen and on the weather. There is nothing hindering me in expressing my revolutionary thoughts, except that there is no one listening to me." The evening after this encounter, Kapp attended a meeting of the "Latin farmers." The original purpose of the meetings had been to revive aspects of their former student life in Heidelberg, with its traditions, its songs and its drinking sessions, but the meeting ended in meaningless conversations: "Our life here would actually be quite bearable, if we only had a bowling lane."

=== Illinois ===
A. B. Faust speculates that the appellative "Latin settlement" or "Latin farmers" was first used in connection with some German settlers of Belleville/Shiloh, Illinois, a large group of men who had been members of the "Burschenschaften," the German student fraternities of a political cast, which had been made special objects of vengeance by the arbitrary governors of the reactionary period in Germany. Many friends of gymnasium or university days gathered together within the radius of a few miles. Such were George Engelmann, G. Bunsen, A. Berchelmann, Gustav Körner, Theodor Hilgard, Theodor J. Krafft, Georg Neuhoff, Theodor and Adolf Engelmann, Karl Schreiber, Karl Friedrich, Ernst Decker, Wilhelm Weber, August Dilg. In 1849 there was added Friedrich Hecker, the leader of the insurrectionary forces in Baden during the revolution of 1848–49. At the university Hecker had fought a duel with Gustav Körner; now these men extended to one another the hand of comradeship in their new home.

The German immigrants of St. Clair County, Illinois, were interested and wide awake in politics. In Belleville, with over 15,000 inhabitants, it happened that for years no native-born American sat in the city council, and that all civic offices were filled by German immigrants. The county officers likewise were generally German immigrants, and their influence extended beyond the county limits. Eduard Retz was three times state treasurer, and Gustav Körner was lieutenant-governor of Illinois in 1852. Under Julius Raith, a company of German immigrants was recruited for the Mexican–American War, and during the Civil War all men capable of bearing arms fought for the cause of the Union. As early as 1836 a "Deutsche Bibliotheks-Gesellschaft" (German Library Association) was formed in Shiloh, which founded a library that in 1879 contained 5,500 volumes, exclusive of public documents presented by Congress.

== Settlements ==
The five Texas settlements "officially" considered historical "Latin Settlements":

- Bettina, Llano County, 1847 named after Bettina von Arnim
- Latium, Washington County; the founder was the German Victor Witte (1820–1900), among the first settlers were the artist Rudolph Melchior and Wittes Schwager, as well as the engineer Hermann Rogalla von Bieberstein.
- Millheim, Austin County
- Sisterdale, Kendall County, Nicolaus Zink built the first house in 1847, Ernst Kapp founded the settlement in 1849
- Tusculum, Kendall County, founded in 1849, name changed in 1852 to Boerne after the German author and publicist Ludwig Börne.

Occasionally the following locations in Texas are also named among the "Latin Settlements":

- Bluff, Fayette County
- Castell, Llano County
- Comfort, Kendall County
- Frelsburg, Colorado County
- Leiningen, Llano County
- Meyersville, DeWitt County
- Ratcliffe, DeWitt County
- Schoenburg, Llano County
- Shelby, Austin County
- Klein, Harris County

Outside Texas the following are also sometimes considered "Latin Settlements":

- Dutzow, Warren County, Missouri
- Belleville, St. Clair County, Illinois
