= John Hancock (Texas politician) =

American politician (1824–1893)

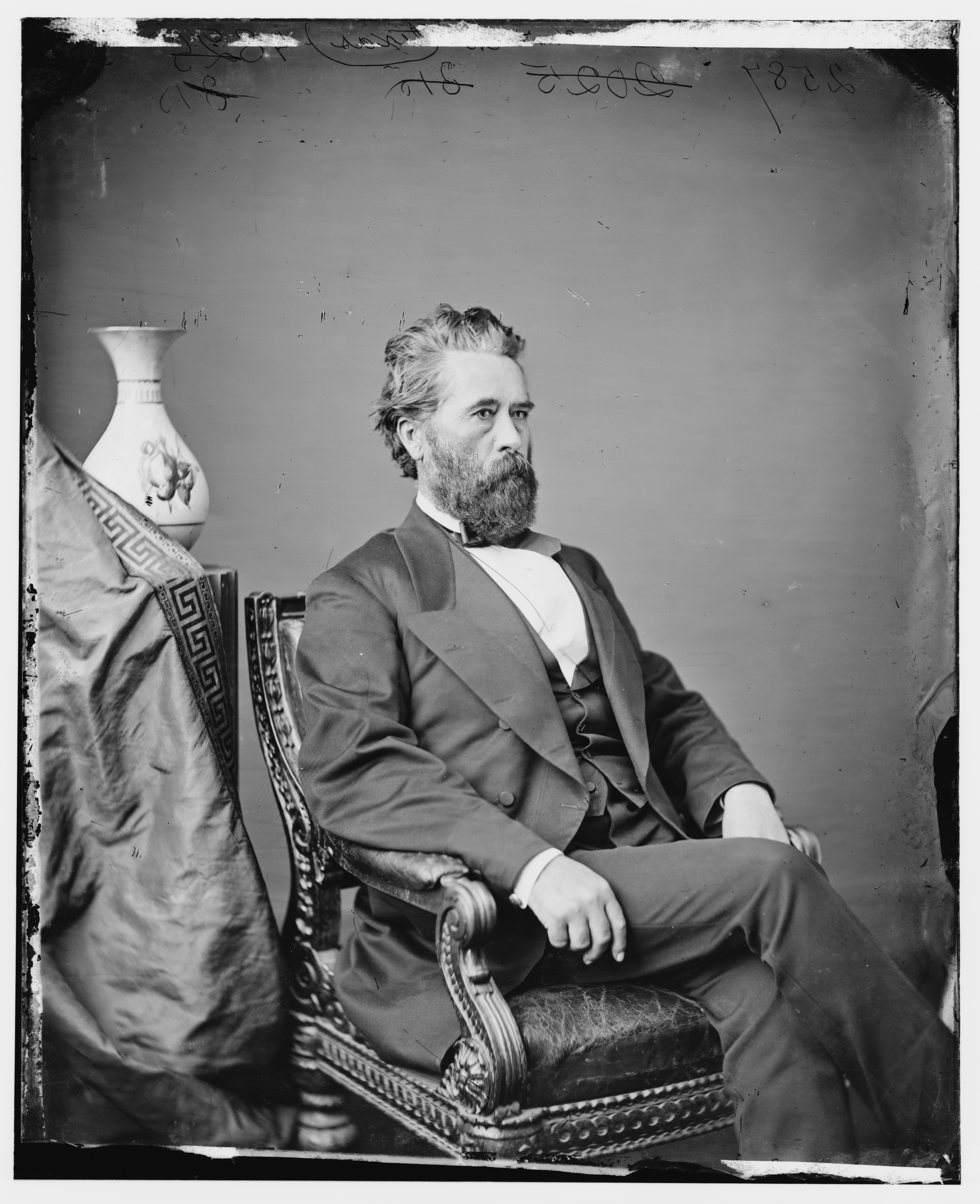

Member of the U.S. House of Representatives from Texas
- In office March 4, 1883 – March 3, 1885
- Preceded by: district established
- Succeeded by: Joseph D. Sayers
- Constituency: 10th district
- In office March 4, 1871 – March 3, 1877
- Preceded by: Edward Degener
- Succeeded by: De Witt C. Giddings
- Constituency: 4th district (1871–1875); 5th district (1875–1877)

Member of the Texas House of Representatives for the 57th district
- In office 1860–1861

District Judge Texas 2nd Judicial District
- In office 1851–1855

Personal details
- Born: October 24, 1824 Jackson County, Alabama, U.S.
- Died: July 19, 1893 (aged 68) Austin, Texas, U.S.
- Resting place: Oakwood Cemetery
- Party: Democratic
- Spouse: Susan Richardson
- Education: East Tennessee University

Military service
- Allegiance: Union (American Civil War)
- Rank: Conscientious objector: fled to Mexico

John Hancock (October 24, 1824 – July 19, 1893) was an American judge and politician. As a member of the Texas Legislature he opposed the secession of Texas during the American Civil War. After the war he represented Texas in the United States House of Representatives as a member of the Democratic Party.

== Early life ==
John Hancock was born in Jackson County, Alabama, the seventh of ten children born to John Allen Hancock and Sarah Ryan Hancock. His older brother George Duncan Hancock was a veteran of Battle of San Jacinto and represented Travis County in the Eleventh Texas Legislature.

Hancock attended the East Tennessee University at Knoxville. He later worked on his father's farm in Alabama before beginning his study of law in Winchester, Tennessee. In 1846 he was admitted to the Alabama bar. In January 1847 he moved to Austin, Texas, where he practiced law. In 1851 he was elected district judge of the Second Judicial District for a term of six years. After four years he resigned to resume his lucrative law practice, as well as to engage in farming.

== Civil War ==
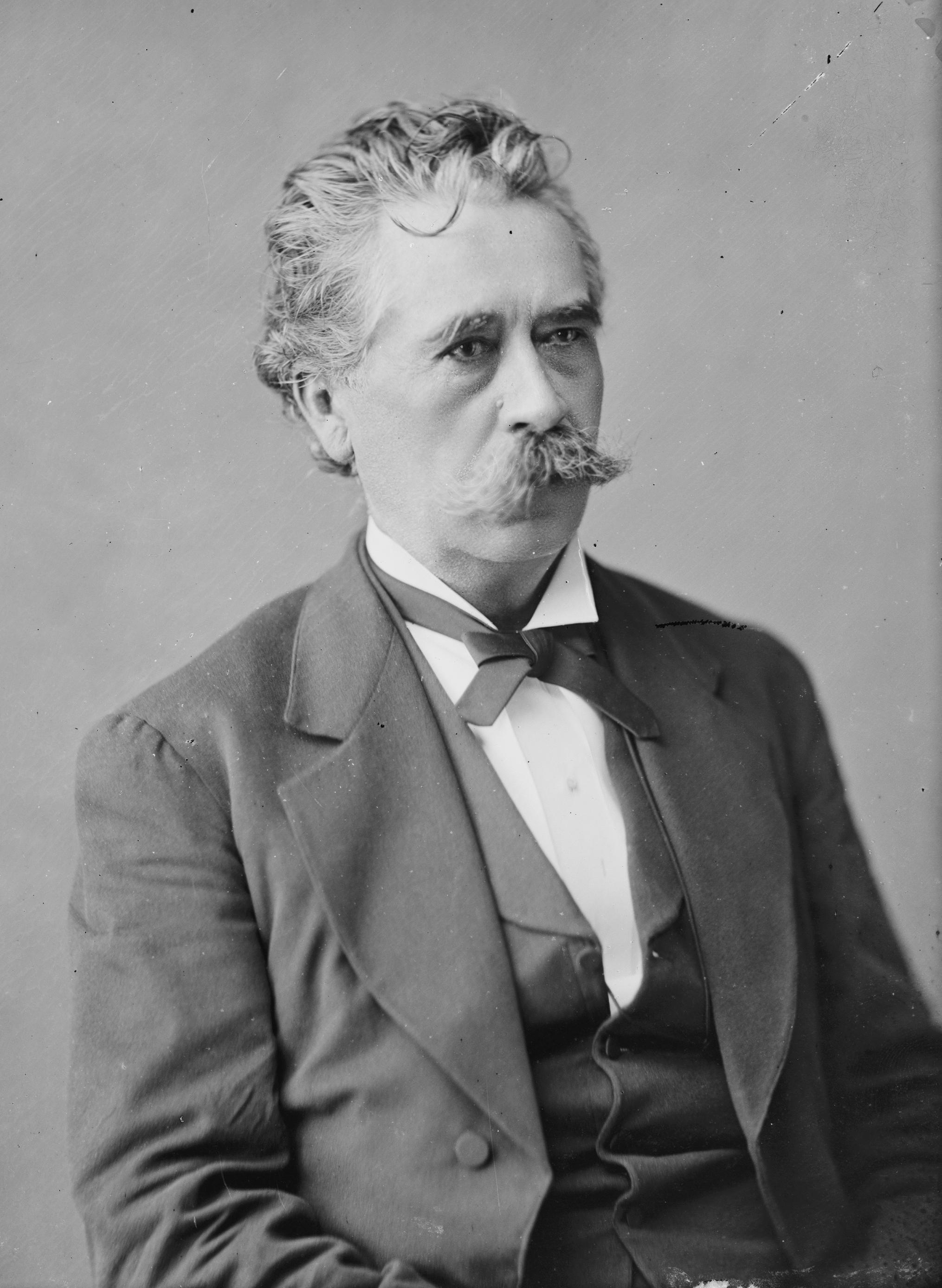
John Hancock during the postbellum period.

At the outbreak of the Civil War, Hancock strongly believed that Texas should remain part of the Union. In 1860 he was elected to the Texas House of Representatives as a Unionist. After the secession of Texas in March 1861, he refused to take the oath of allegiance to the Confederate States of America and was expelled from the legislature. During the Civil War he practiced law in the state courts but refused to conduct business or recognize the authority in the Confederate courts. He refused to take part in military service during the war, and in 1864 he fled to Mexico to escape conscription for the Confederacy. After the end of the war he returned to Texas and took part in the restoration of order, including serving as a delegate to the state constitutional convention in 1866.

== Post war years ==
In 1870 he was elected to the United States Congress and served from 1871 to 1877. He served again from 1883 to 1885. He supported the Native American policy of Ulysses S. Grant, which called for placing Native Americans on reservations under supervision of the federal government. While in Congress he helped in the passage of acts related to Native American policy. These acts included changing the manner of issuing rations to Native Americans on the reservations, stipulating that they were to be given once a week, as well as prohibiting Native American hunting-parties unless accompanied by United States Army troops. This latter policy ended raids by Native Americans from the reservations. He also helped establish a military telegraph around the Texas frontier.

== Death ==
He died in Austin in 1893 and is buried in Oakwood Cemetery.

== Legacy ==
On the eighth season of Who Do You Think You Are?, actress and comedian Aisha Tyler learned that Congressman John Hancock was her great-great-great-grandfather. Hancock fathered two sons with one of his slaves. The older, surviving son, Hugh Hancock, is through whom Tyler is descended. Hugh Hancock would become a prominent leader of the Austin African-American community. Active in the local Republican Party, Hugh ran a bar called the Black Elephant. Hugh Berry Hancock died in Pocatello, Idaho

U.S. House of Representatives
Preceded by Edward Degener	Member of the U.S. House of Representatives from Texas's 4th congressional district 1871–1875	Succeeded by Roger Q. Mills
Preceded by Roger Q. Mills	Member of the U.S. House of Representatives from Texas's 5th congressional district 1875–1877	Succeeded by De Witt C. Giddings
Preceded by none	Member of the U.S. House of Representatives from Texas's 10th congressional district 1883–1885	Succeeded by Joseph D. Sayers
