= August Siemering =

German Texan educator, writer and political leader

- Born: February 8, 1828; Brandenburg, Germany
- Died: September 9, 1883 (aged 55); San Antonio, Texas, US
- Occupation: Publisher
- Known for: Freethinker; Abolitionist

August Siemering (1828 – 1883) was a German Texan educator, writer, publisher and political leader.

== Early years ==
August Siemering was born in Brandenburg, Germany, on February 8, 1828.

== Texas ==
=== Forty-Eighters and Freethinkers ===
A liberal in politics, Siemering emigrated from Germany in 1851, and was among the first Forty-Eighters to settle in Sisterdale, Texas, a Free Thinker Latin Settlement resulting from the Revolutions of 1848 in the German states.

The Forty-Eighters were intellectual liberal abolitionists who enjoyed conversing in Latin and believed in utopian ideals that guaranteed basic human rights to all. They reveled in passionate conversations about literature, music and philosophy.

In 1853, Siemering was elected Secretary, and Ernst Kapp the President, of the Freethinker abolitionist organization Die Freie Verein (The Free Society), which called for a meeting of abolitionist German Texans in conjunction with the May 14, 1854 Staats-Saengerfest (State Singing Festival) in San Antonio, Texas. The convention adopted a political, social and religious platform, including:

1) Equal pay for equal work; 2) Direct election of the President of the United States; 3) Abolition of capital punishment; 4) Slavery is an evil, the abolition of which is a requirement of democratic principles...; 5) Free schools – including universities - supported by the state, without religious influence; and 6) Total separation of church and state.

=== Teaching ===
In 1856, Siemering became a teacher at the first public school in Fredericksburg, Texas a Catholic school.

=== Military service ===
Abolitionist Siemering was drafted into the Confederate States Army in 1861, serving three years before resigning his commission as a lieutenant. He referred to that war as "...a nightmare."

=== Publisher ===
The San Antonio Express News was first published by Siemering in 1865, along with co-publisher H. Palmer. Siemering and Palmer also published the German language newspaper Die Freie Presse für Texas.

=== Public service ===
In 1866, Siemering was appointed Chief Justice of Bexar County, but only served until August of that year, when an act of the legislature changed the office to an elected office of County Judge. He chose not to run for election for the position. He was, however, the Republican Party's candidate for Lieutenant Governor in 1880, losing to Democrat J.D. Sayers.

== Personal life and death ==
During his tenure as a teacher in Fredericksburg, Siemering met his future wife Clara Schütze, daughter of another teacher. They married in 1859.

Siemering died September 9, 1883.

== Works by Siemering ==
- Siemering, August. Texas als Ziel deutscher Auswanderung. OCLC 25812235.
- Siemering, August (1856). Lebensbilder aus den Süden (Life Images from the South). New York. OCLC 29977390.
- Siemering, August (1982). The Hermit of the Cavern; a Novel of the Early Sixties. San Antonio, TX: Naylor Print. Co. ISBN 9781426350443. OCLC 2733954.
- Siemering, August; Burrier, William Paul; Dietert, Helen; Pue, Ronnie (2013). August Siemering's Die Deutschen in Texas waehrend des Buergerkrieges = The Germans in Texas during the Civil War. Tamarac, FL: Llumina Press. ISBN 9781605949994.
