= Hermann Rogalla von Bieberstein =

American politician

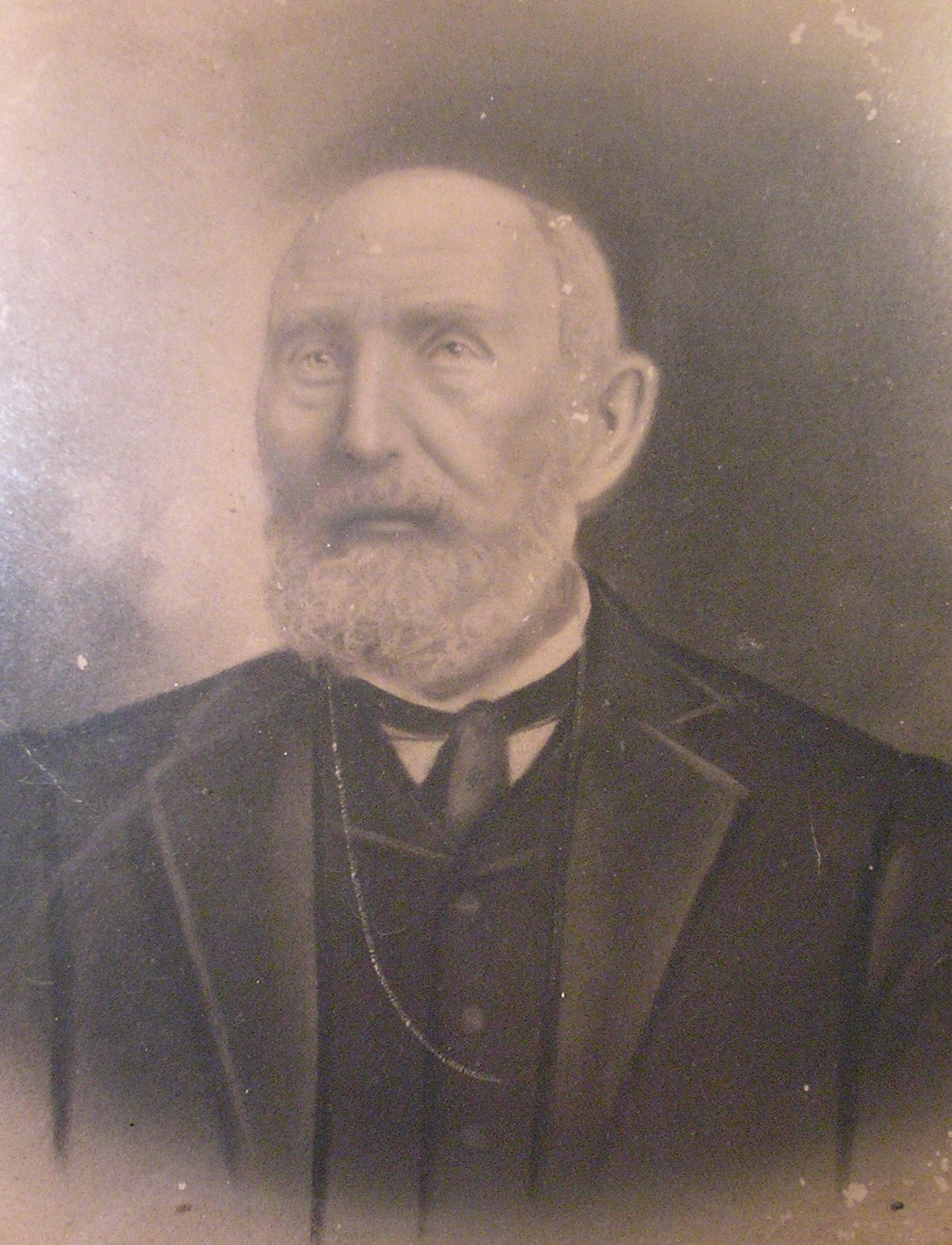
An 1874 picture of Hermann Rogalla von Bieberstein

Hermann Rogalla von Bieberstein (March 12, 1823 – March 18, 1906) was a former member of the Texas legislature, he was of the Democratic Party. He was a German from what was then Brieg and the son of a Prussian royal soldier. He helped found the Latin Settlement of Texas.
