= Edward Degener =

American politician (1809–1890)

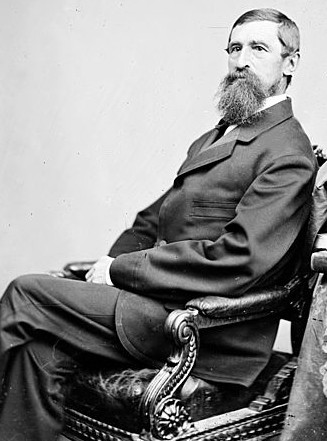

San Antonio City Council
- In office 1872–1878

Member of the U.S. House of Representatives from Texas's 4th district
- In office March 31, 1870 – March 3, 1871
- Preceded by: District created
- Succeeded by: John Hancock

Personal details
- Born: October 20, 1809 Brunswick, Prussia (now Braunschweig, Germany)
- Died: September 11, 1890 (aged 80) San Antonio, Texas, U.S.
- Resting place: San Antonio City Cemetery No. 1
- Party: Republican

Edward Degener (October 20, 1809 – September 11, 1890) was a German-born American politician. He was a Republican U.S. Representative from Texas during the Reconstruction era.

Originally from Germany, Degener moved to the United States and lived in Texas. During the American Civil War, slave-holding Texas joined the Confederacy, but Degener remained loyal to the Union, and was persecuted by the Confederates for this loyalty to the U.S. Two of Degener's sons were murdered by the Confederates in the Nueces massacre. After the war ended, Degener served as a Republican congressman for the Texan 4th Congressional District and as a San Antonio city council member in the 1870s. He died in 1890.

== Early life and education ==
Born in Brunswick in the Kingdom of Prussia (now Germany), Degener pursued an academic course in Germany and in England. He was twice a member of the legislative body in Anhalt-Dessau and was a member of the first German National Assembly at Frankfurt-am-Main in 1848.

He immigrated to the United States in 1850 and settled in Sisterdale, Texas, in the Texas Hill Country west of San Antonio, with its burgeoning German immigrant population. Degener engaged in agricultural pursuits.

== Career ==
=== American Civil War ===
During the U.S. Civil War, civilian Degener was arrested by the Confederate army and charged with being "a dangerous and seditious person and an enemy to the government." Degener had allegedly criticized the Confederacy, corresponded with alleged enemies of same, and failed to report known Union sympathizers. Degener pleaded not guilty. His legal counsel challenged the legal authority of the military, and the charge of sedition, which was not a crime legally recognized by the government. Found guilty anyway, he was ordered to post a bond of $5,000 that he would be loyal to the Confederacy.

Degener's sons Hugo and Hilmar died during the Nueces massacre when they were murdered by the Confederates. To honor their memory, Degener along with Eduard Steves and William Heuermann, purchased land for the establishment of the German-language Treue der Union Monument, which became part of the National Register of Historic Places listings in Texas November 29, 1978.

=== Politics ===
Degener served as member of the Texas constitutional conventions in 1866 and 1868, and served on the Committee for Immigration along with fellow committee members Julius Scheutze, H.H. Foster, George W. Smith, Erwin Wilson, John Morse and Stephen Curtis (the lone black man on the committee).

Upon the readmission of the State of Texas to representation was elected as a Republican to the Forty-first Congress and served from March 31, 1870, to March 3, 1871. Degener was an unsuccessful candidate for reelection in 1870 to the Forty-second Congress.

He served as member of the city council of San Antonio, Texas from 1872 to 1878.

== Later life and death ==
Degener died in San Antonio on September 11, 1890, at the age of 80.

== See also ==
U.S. House of Representatives
Preceded by District Created	Member of the U.S. House of Representatives from Texas's 4th congressional district March 30, 1870–March 3, 1871	Succeeded by John Hancock
