= Julius Fröbel =

German mineralogist (1805–1893)

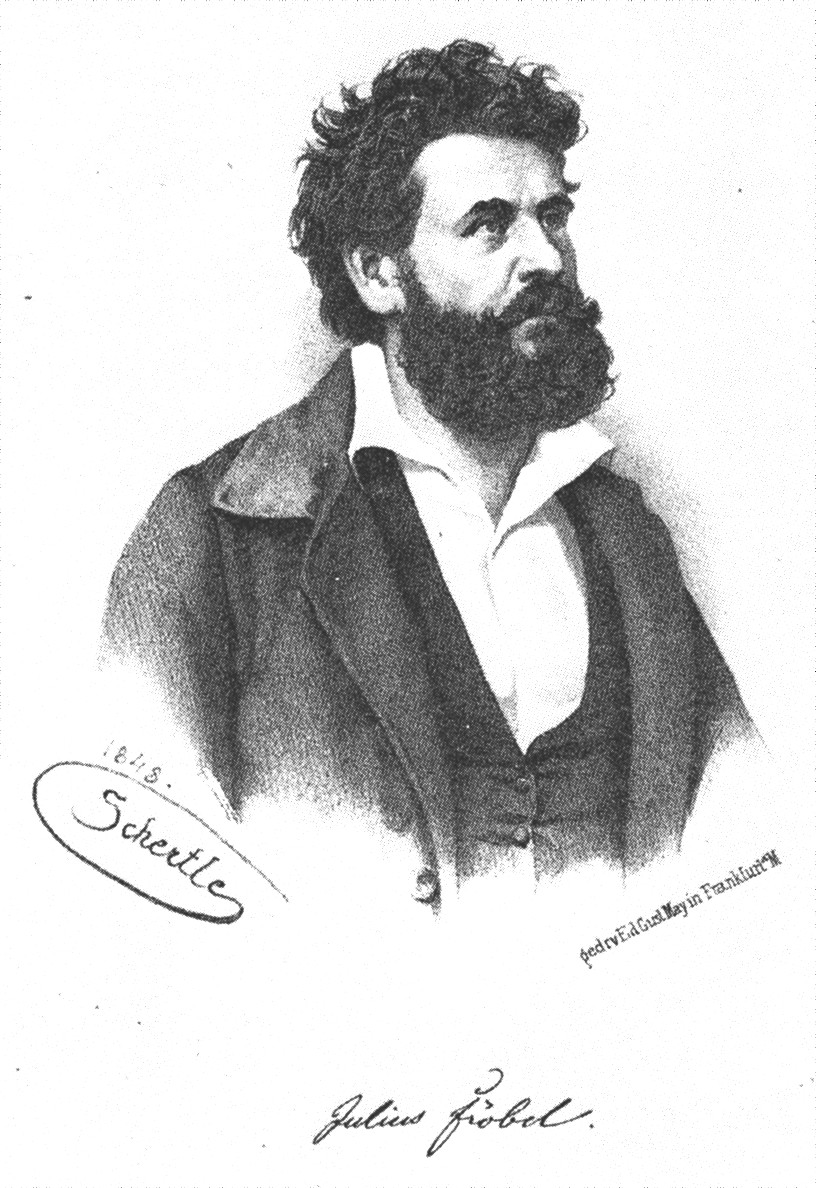
Julius Fröbel, lithography (1848)

Carl Ferdinand Julius Fröbel (16 July 1805 – 7 November 1893) was a German geologist and mineralogist, journalist, and democratic revolutionary already during the Vormärz era. He was active in Germany, Switzerland, the United States and South America at different times in his life.

== Biography ==
He was born in the village of Griesheim (today part of the Stadtilm), in Schwarzburg-Rudolstadt. He was the son of pastor Johann Michael Christoph Fröbel (d. 1813) and his wife Christiane Sopie. He attended the educational institute of his uncle Friedrich Fröbel, the founder of the kindergarten system, and continued his studies of natural sciences at the University of Jena, the Ludwig-Maximilians-Universität München, and the Friedrich Wilhelm University of Berlin. By the agency of Alexander von Humboldt, Fröbel took up a teaching position at the University of Zurich in 1833 and became a naturalized citizen of Switzerland. From 1836, he taught mineralogy at the University of Zurich. In 1838, he married his first wife Kleophea, née Zeller.

Upon the reactionary Züriputsch in 1839, he joined the radical party, and edited Der schweizerische Republikaner (The Swiss Republican) for them. In 1840/1841, he established a publishing house (Literarisches Comptoir) at Zurich. He issued several scientific works and many political pamphlets, many of which were suppressed in the states of the German Confederation, among them writings by Bruno Bauer, Friedrich Engels, Ludwig Feuerbach, Arnold Ruge, Friedrich Wilhelm Schulz, and David Strauss, as well as poems by Georg Herwegh, Hoffmann von Fallersleben and Gottfried Keller.

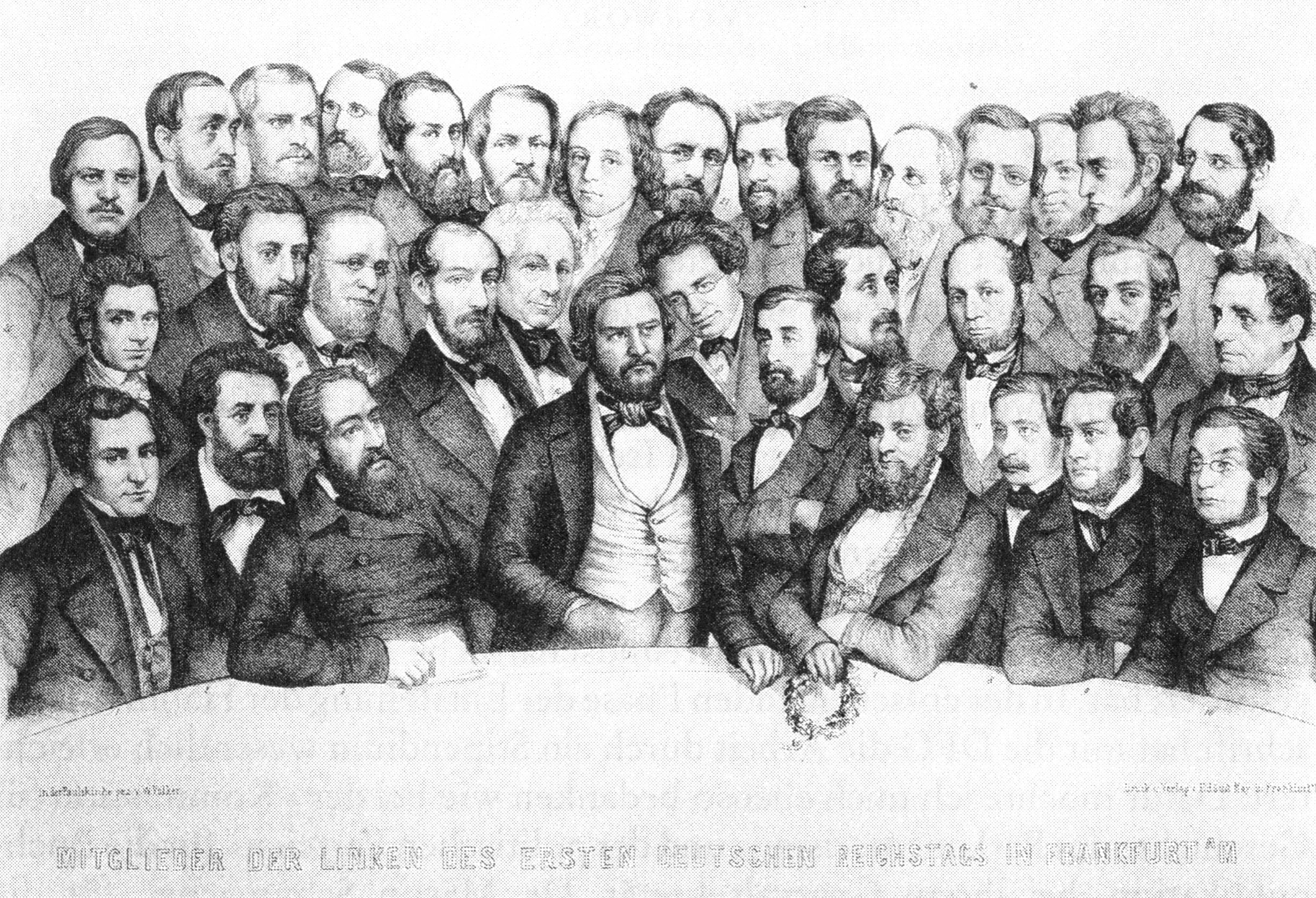
Fröbel (1st row, 2nd from left) with the members of the Left faction in the Frankfurt Assembly

In 1846, Fröbel moved to Dresden, Saxony. Upon the Revolution of 1848, he became a leader of the democrats, and was elected a member of the Frankfurt Parliament. Afterward, he accompanied the radical Robert Blum to the Austrian capital Vienna, where both joined the bloody October Uprising. Fröbel was arrested and condemned to death by the court-martial that also convicted Blum, who was shot on 9 November. Fröbel was pardoned by Field Marshal Prince Alfred of Windisch-Grätz before the date of his execution was fixed.

On the dissolution of the Frankfurt Parliament in 1849, he immigrated to the United States, where he became editor of a German-language newspaper, lectured in New York City, and was a member of the law firm of Zitz, Kapp & Fröbel for a time. He was for a time residing among German Free Thinkers in Sisterdale, Texas. In 1850, he went to Nicaragua, Santa Fe, and Chihuahua as correspondent of the New York Tribune. In 1855, he was editor of a San Francisco paper. After the death of his first wife, he secondly married Karolina (1821–1888), a daughter of the former Greek prime minister Count Josef Ludwig von Armansperg.

After a general amnesty, Fröbel returned to Germany in 1857. Efforts were made to expel him from Frankfurt, but he was protected on the ground of his naturalization as a citizen of the United States. In 1863, he went again to Vienna, and became a federalist leader supporting a "Greater German" solution of the German Question. From 1862 to 1873, he edited newspapers in Vienna and Munich. After the unification of Germany, he was appointed consul of the German Empire at Smyrna in 1873, and in 1876 was transferred to Algiers. Fröbel retired in 1888; he died in Zurich, at the age of 88.

== Works ==
- System of Social Politics (London, 1847)
- The Republican, an historical drama (1848)
- Seven Years' Travel in Central America, Northern Mexico, and the Far West of the United States (1859)
- Theory of Politics (1861)
- Political Addresses (1870)
- Die Wirtschaft des Menschengeschlechts (1870–76)
- Ein Lebenslauf, an autobiography (1890–1891)

== Bibliography ==
- Wilson, J. G.; Fiske, J., eds. (1900). "Frœbel, Julius" . Appletons' Cyclopædia of American Biography. New York: D. Appleton.
- Gilman, D. C.; Peck, H. T.; Colby, F. M., eds. (1906). "Fröbel, Julius" . New International Encyclopedia (1st ed.). New York: Dodd, Mead.
- Carl Wittke, Refugees of Revolution: The German Forty-Eighters in America, Philadelphia: Univ. of Penn. Press, 1952, pp. 325–326. At archive.org
- Frobel, Julius, Amerika, Europa, Und Die Politischen Gesichtspunkte Der Gegenwart (1859) (German POD scanned edition), Kessinger Publishing, LLC, 2009, ISBN 978-1-104-00888-8
- Frobel, Julius, Briefe über die Wiener Oktober-Revolution: Mit Notizen über die Letzten Tage Robert Blum's (German POD scanned edition), Nabu Press, 2010, ISBN 978-1-146-21724-8
- Frobel, Julius, Theorie der Politik: Als Ergebniss Einer Erneuerten Prüfung Demokratischer Lehrmeinungen (German POD scanned edition), BiblioBazaar, 2009, ISBN 978-1-116-20895-5
