= Adolf Douai =

German Texan teacher and abolitionist (1819–1888)

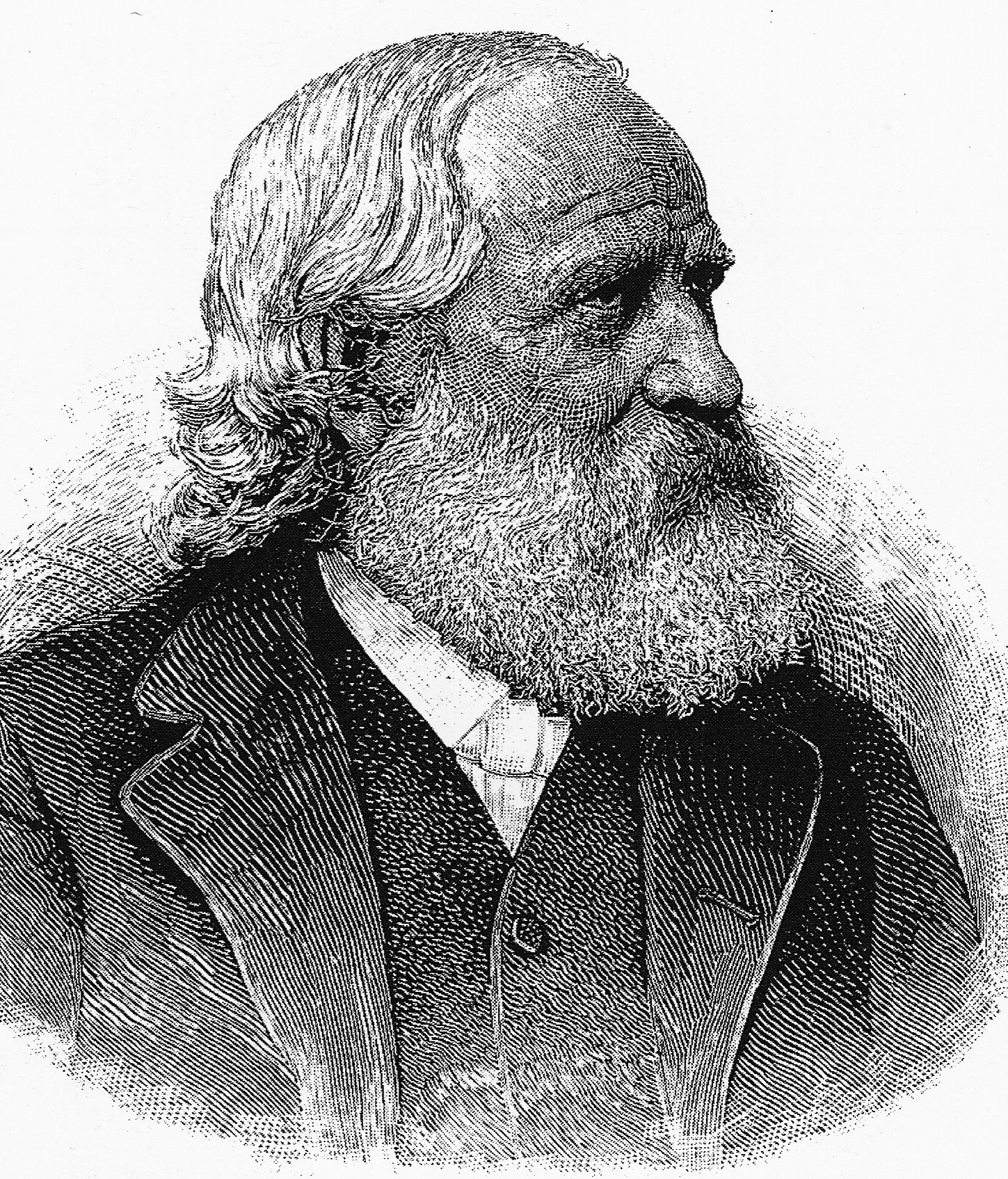
Adolf Douai

Karl Daniel Adolf Douai (1819 – 1888), known to his peers as "Adolf", was a German Texan teacher as well as a socialist and abolitionist newspaper editor. Douai was driven from Texas in 1856 due to his published opposition of slavery, living out the rest of his life as a school operator in the New England city of Boston. Douai is remembered as one of the leading American Marxists of the 19th century as well as a pioneer of the Kindergarten movement in America.

== Biography ==
=== Early years ===
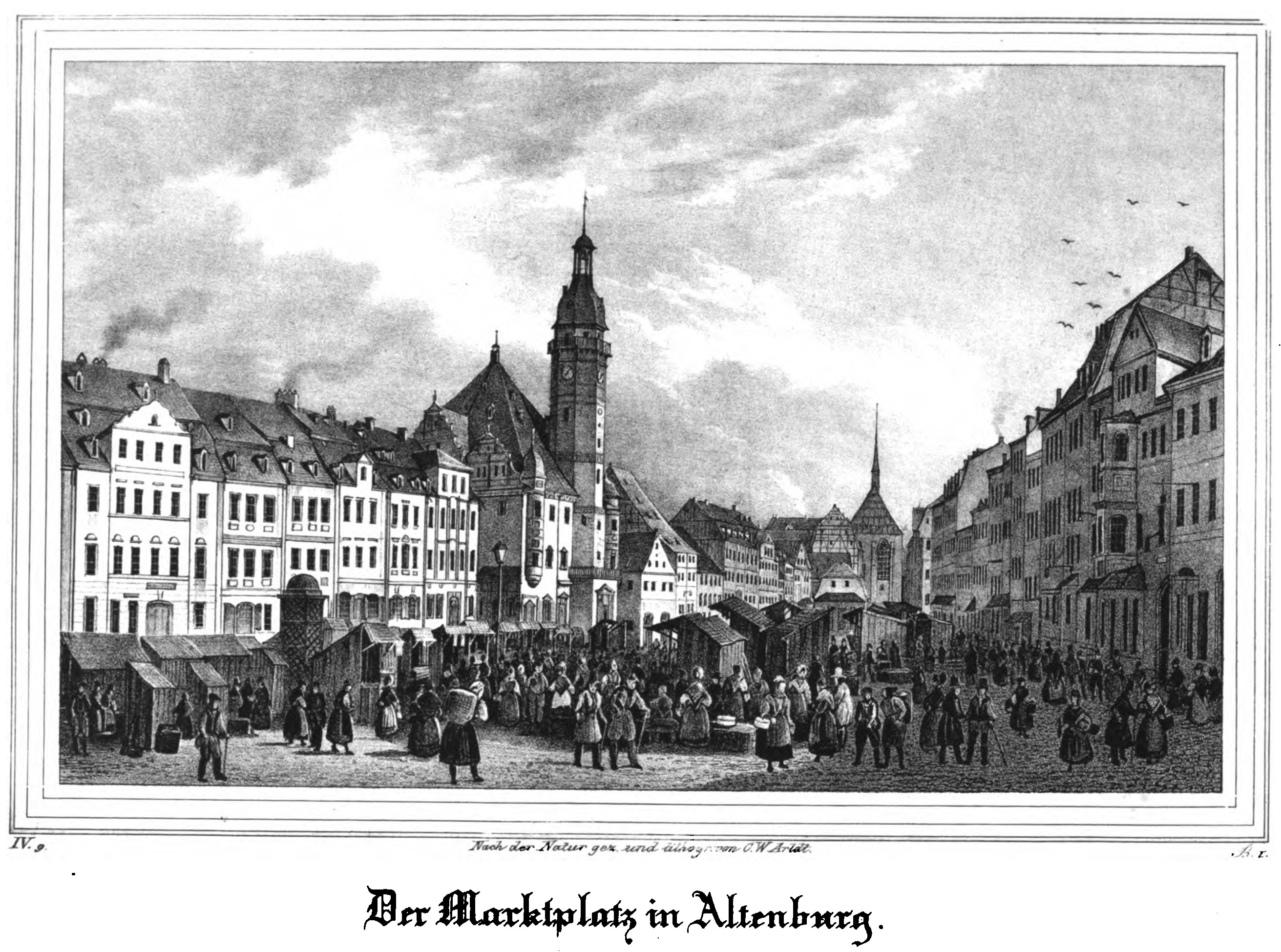
The public square of Altenburg, Thuringia as it appeared in 1839, when Douai was 20.

Karl Daniel Adolf Douai was born in Altenburg, Thuringia, on February 22, 1819, to Carl Eduard and Eleanora Douai. The Douai family was of French extraction, having fled to Dresden after the fall of the French Revolution.

Douai's family was poor and he went to work at the age of 8. He worked variously in his boyhood years as a newsboy, as an assistant to his father in teaching peasant children, as a crocheter of home manufactured wollen shawls, among other small jobs. Douai was poorly nourished as a child and short of stature, standing just 4 feet 8 inches (1.42 m) tall at age 19.

Douai graduated from the Altenburg Gymnasium elementary school and gymnasium in Altenburg and studied philology and history at the University of Leipzig from 1838 to 1841. He wanted to continue his education at the University of Jena, but was unable to afford it. After working as a private tutor in Russia he was able to pass the examination at the University of Dorpat, receiving the titles of doctor and professor.

While at university, Douai found the stipends insufficient and therefore sought to supplement his income by writing. In a short autobiography published at the time of his death, Douai claimed to have authored several novels and two theological papers during his undergraduate years.

Douai married Baroness Agnes von Beust, with whom he had ten children, on September 26, 1843, in the city of Königsberg.

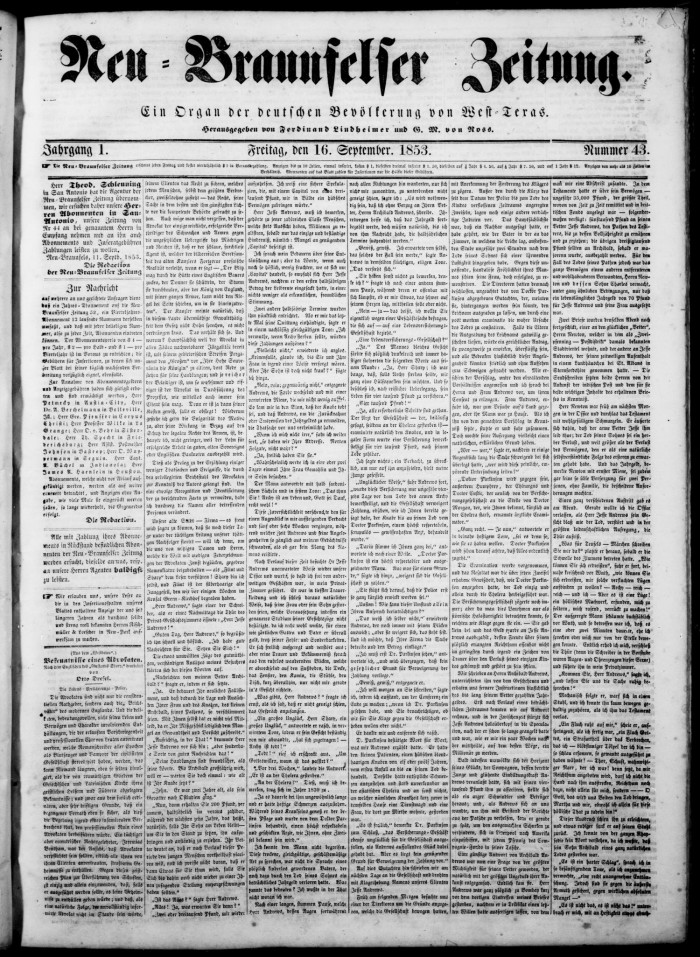
Douai was instrumental in establishing the Neue Braunfelser Zeitung in 1852, a German newspaper edited by Ferdinand Lindheimer.

Life in Russia had a radicalizing impact upon Douai and after 5 years in the country he returned to his native Altenburg, convinced that a revolution for constitutional and democratic government was in the wings. There he bought a building and hired assistants and established a private preparatory school.

Returning to Altenburg in 1846, Douai established a private secondary school that focused on natural sciences and modern languages. During the Revolutions of 1848 Douai helped organize clubs for workers and students and took an active part in the political movement, sitting as a member of the revolutionary Landtag of Saxe-Altenberg. His political activity brought him to the attention of the government of Saxony, which arrested him and charged him with high treason and rioting in the summer of 1848. Douai prevailed on the charge of treason but was nevertheless sentenced to one year in prison on three of the counts against him, a result which forced him to close his school and disburse its property. Das ABC des Sozialismus, a 94-page book by Douai, was published in Altenburg in 1851.

=== Texas years ===
Douai was pressured by the government to emigrate and moved to New Braunfels, Texas, in 1851. There he helped to raise funds to launch the Neue Braunfelser Zeitung, a publication edited by his friend Ferdinand Lindheimer, on November 12, 1852.

Douai also attempted to establish another school, but the efforts of the free-thinker Douai were impeded by a local Catholic priest, who spoke out against the schoolmaster, prompting parents to withdraw their children from his school. Douai subsequently fell ill with cholera, resulting in the termination of the school.

With his first business effort a failure, Douai moved to nearby San Antonio and turned his attention to newspaper work, launching a newspaper, the San Antonio Deutsche Zeitung (German News), on July 5, 1853. In his paper, Douai denounced slavery as an evil incompatible with democracy, urged its abolition, and advocated in favor of establishing a slavery free state in the territory of western Texas. The stockholders of the paper sold their shares to Douai, Frederick Law Olmsted, and other abolitionists. However, declining revenue and local opposition, with threats to lynch him being common, forced him to sell the paper to Gustav Schleicher in 1856. In 1868, Douai received a newspaper from a Texan newspaper operated by black people claiming to use the same press he had used for the San Antonio Deutsche Zeitung.

=== Northern years ===
Douai was the author of one of the first American international socialist pamphlets in the English language, the 1877 tract Better Times!

The black population of Philadelphia held a rally for Douai upon his arrival and raised funds for him to possible establish a newspaper. He moved to Boston, Massachusetts, and supported the Republican Party during the 1856 elections. Douai established the first kindergarten in the United States in 1859. He began working as a private tutor, also teaching at a New England institute for the blind in south Boston. While in Boston, Douai established a German workingmen's club which in 1859 sponsored a three-classroom school featuring the first American Kindergarten.

Douai left Boston in 1860, and moved to Hoboken, New Jersey, and became editor of the New York Demokrat, a position which he soon abandoned to assume the position of Principal of the Hoboken Academy. He taught there for six years, moving to New York City in 1866 to establish a new school of his own. This New York school lost its leased building as part of an expansion of Broadway in 1871, prompting Douai to move to Newark, New Jersey, to accept a post as principal of the Green Street School there. Douai remained in Newark in this position until 1876, at which time a new board of directors were elected who were opposed to him.

After being removed from his position in Newark, Douai accepted an offer to start a new educational academy in Irvington, New Jersey, but no suitable building could be had to bring the project to fruition. This event essentially brought Douai's teaching career to a close.

He was an early and prominent member of the Socialist Labor Party of America, one of the first Marxist political party in America, established as the "Workingmen's Party of the United States" in 1876.

In the fall of 1877 there was a short-lived plan for Douai to serve as English-language translator of Das Kapital, the magnum opus of Karl Marx first published in 1867. In January 1878, the German-language socialist daily newspaper the New Yorker Volkszeitung (New York People's News) was established, and Douai began to write extensively for the publication. It was there that Douai gained his greatest public fame as a journalist and publicist.

=== Death and legacy ===
On January 21, 1888, Douai died in Brooklyn, New York, after having suffered chronic "throat trouble." He was cremated and a public memorial was held January 23 at the Brooklyn Labor Lyceum.

An unpublished typescript of an English translation of Adolph Douai's autobiography resides at the San Antonio Public Library.

== Works cited ==
- Cook, Marjorie (1976). "New Braunfels Herald-Zeitung". Texas State Historical Association. Archived from the original on March 17, 2025.
- Foner, Philip (1977). American Socialism and Black Americans: From The Age of Jackson to World War II. Greenwood Publishing Group. ISBN 0837195454.
- Sibley, Marilyn (December 1, 1994). "Douai, Carl Daniel Adolph (1819–1888)". Texas State Historical Association. Archived from the original on March 17, 2025.
