= Nueces massacre =

1862 massacre in Kinney County, Texas

- Part of the American Civil War
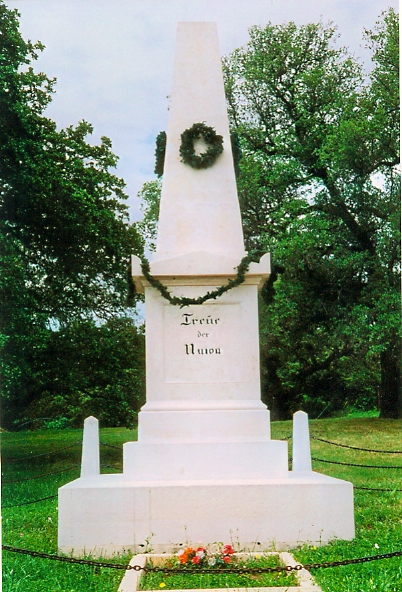
- Treǔe der Union ("Loyalty to the Union") monument to the German Texans slain in the Nueces Massacre
Date	August 10, 1862
Location	Nueces River
Result	Confederate victory, execution or flight of all German Texans

Belligerents
Confederate States of America	Texas-German Unionists

Commanders and leaders
Hamilton Bee, James Duff, Colin McRae	Fritz Tegener

Strength
96	61

Casualties and losses
2 dead, 18 wounded	37 dead, unknown wounded and fled

The Nueces Massacre, also known as the Massacre on the Nueces and the Battle of Nueces, was a violent confrontation between Confederate soldiers and Unionist Texas Germans on August 10, 1862, in Kinney County, Texas.

Many first-generation German immigrants settled in Central Texas in a region known as the Hill Country. They tended to support the United States and were opposed to slavery. Because of these sentiments, the Confederate States of America imposed martial law on Central Texas. A group of German Americans, fleeing from the Hill Country to Mexico and onward to Union-controlled New Orleans, was confronted by a company of Confederate soldiers on the banks of the Nueces River. The ensuing massacre (including of the wounded) represented an end to overt German American resistance to Confederate governance in Texas, but it also fueled outrage among the German-Texan population.

According to historian Stanley McGowen, disputes over the confrontation and the actions of the Confederates after the battle continue in the Hill Country among descendants of both groups.

== Background ==
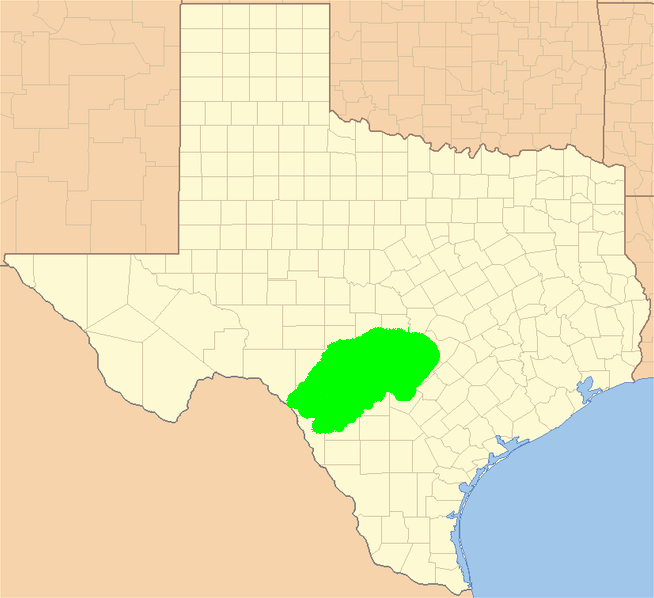
Approximate map of Texas Hill Country

Germans immigrated to Texas as early as 1836. By 1860, the German population in Texas, predominantly first generation immigrants, reached an approximate level of 20,000 across the entire state. They settled heavily in an area known as the Hill Country. The exact dimensions of Hill Country are not concrete. Germans settled so heavily in this area that the counties of Gillespie, Kerr, Kendall, Medina, and Bexar comprised a "German Belt".

During the antebellum period, German opinions on slavery and secession differed. Some Germans owned slaves and supported Texas's secession from the United States. Most Germans, however, were antipathetic to slavery. A vocal minority of Germans opposed slavery actively. These antagonistic Germans included liberal and republican-minded Germans known as Achtundvierziger or Forty-Eighters. Since many Forty-Eighters remained loyal to the United States and did not share the predominant Anglo Texan political outlook,, animosity between the two groups arose. Texas' secession from the United States in March 1861 and the start of the American Civil War on April 12, 1861, magnified these disputes.

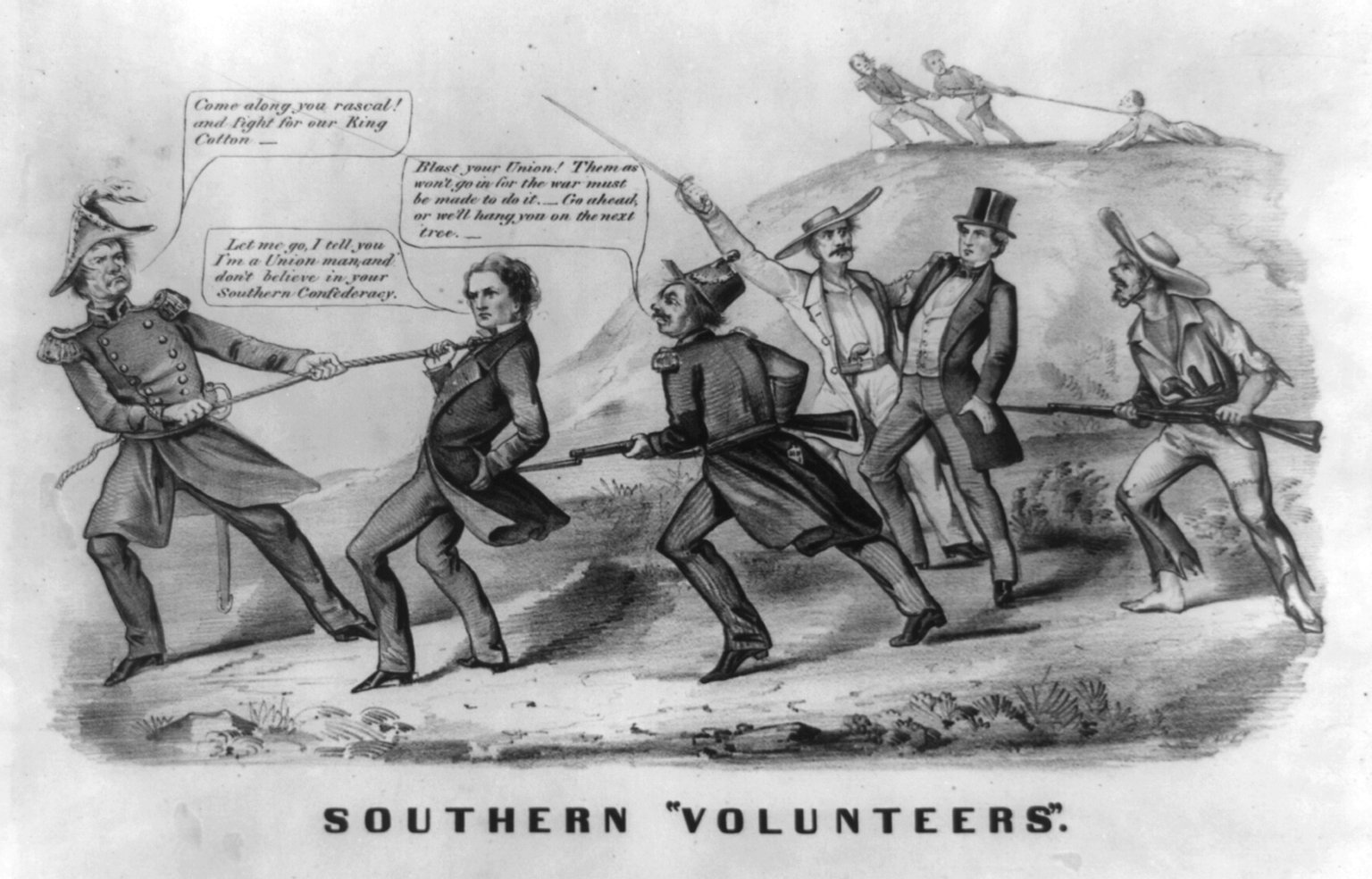
Unionists throughout the Confederate States, including Germans, resisted the imposition of conscription in 1862

Initially, Germans projected an outward appearance of passivity toward the ongoing Civil War. Nevertheless, Confederate officials saw the German population as an internal threat. The most adamant supporters of the United States were Tejanos and the German Texans, both from Central Texas and the counties of the Texas Hill Country. They had some evidence for that suspicion. During the statewide vote on secession, German-heavy counties represented many of those which garnered a majority vote against secession, along with the abolitionist northeast part of the state. Several reports at the beginning of 1862 alleged that German communities celebrated U.S. Army victories. The state government also feared German-run local militias.

The Union Loyal League, organized by several Forty-Eighters, was one such militia. The actual purpose of the league is still debated. Historians Robert Shook and Stanley McGowen acknowledge, as German Texans maintained at the time, that the group's expressed purpose was to defend the Hill Country from Indians and outlaws. Confederates, they confirm, considered the Union Loyal League the enforcement arm of German-Unionist sentiment. Confederate officers even implicated the organization in strategies to free U.S. Army soldiers from Camp Verde.

With a need for more soldiers, the Confederacy established a draft. The Germans did not want to fight against the United States and objected to being drafted. The buildup to this event began in the spring of 1862 with the Confederacy's initiation of conscription of Texans, to which many German Texans voiced their objection. The Confederate Conscription Act of 1862 turned general German objection into open opposition. Because of this opposition, General Hamilton Bee dispatched Captain James Duff to Gillespie County. In late May 1862, Captain Duff imposed martial law. While in Gillespie County, Captain Duff arrested and executed two Germans. The harsh conduct convinced several Germans to leave Texas. Frederick "Fritz" Tegener and his Union Loyal League associates planned a departure. They aimed to enter Mexico and make their way to U.S.-controlled New Orleans.

== Flight and battle ==
Between August 1, and August 3, 1862, sixty-one German Texans, led by Tegener, departed from Turtle Creek and headed southwest for the Mexican border. Informed of their intentions, on August 3, 1862 Captain Duff dispatched Lieutenant Colin McRae with approximately 96 men to pursue the group. After six days, on August 9, McRae and his men spied the German Texans in a small prairie along the Nueces River. McRae then formulated an attack plan to commence later in the evening. He divided his force into two companies to surround the camp. At approximately 1:00 a.m. on August 10, 1862, the Confederates closed in on the camp. At first, however, even surprise and planning did not favor the Confederates. Two Germans wandering from the camp encountered the force. The Confederates fired on these two Germans, which alerted the camp to the assault, and the Germans beat back the first Confederate charge. Several Germans were disheartened by the Confederate presence and fled the field. Numbers vary, but Stanley McGowen estimates that twenty-three to twenty-eight Germans fled throughout the early morning hours. This reduced the German contingent by over a third. A second Confederate charge, closer to dawn, routed the Germans and led to the flight (at least five Germans fled near the end of the battle, including Tegener), serious incapacitation, or death of all German combatants.

== Casualties and aftermath ==
Out of the 96-man force, the Confederate losses counted two soldiers dead and eighteen wounded, including Lieutenant McRae. Reports on the casualties of the vanquished Germans were sparse and inconclusive. In 1962, historian Robert Shook tallied the German casualties at thirty killed and twenty wounded. A more recent conclusion, made by historian Randolph Campbell in 2003, is that 19 Germans died outright in the assaults on the camp.

This was not the final tally for the German Texans' losses. Following the battle, Confederate soldiers killed nine badly wounded Germans outright; cavalrymen pursued nine more to the Rio Grande, where they likewise killed the fleeing Germans. The complete German casualty report then comes to approximately thirty-seven killed and unknown totals for wounded among those who fled and survived.

Several Germans did survive the engagement and ensuing search. These survivors hid in Texas, fled to Mexico and California, or eventually joined U.S. forces in New Orleans as members of the 1st Texas Cavalry Regiment.

More critical, however, was how the incident affected the German community in Texas for the rest of the war. Though Confederate actions met with some ire and loud objections from other German Texans, the incident marked the general end to overt German Unionist resistance in Texas for the remainder of the war.

== Legacy ==
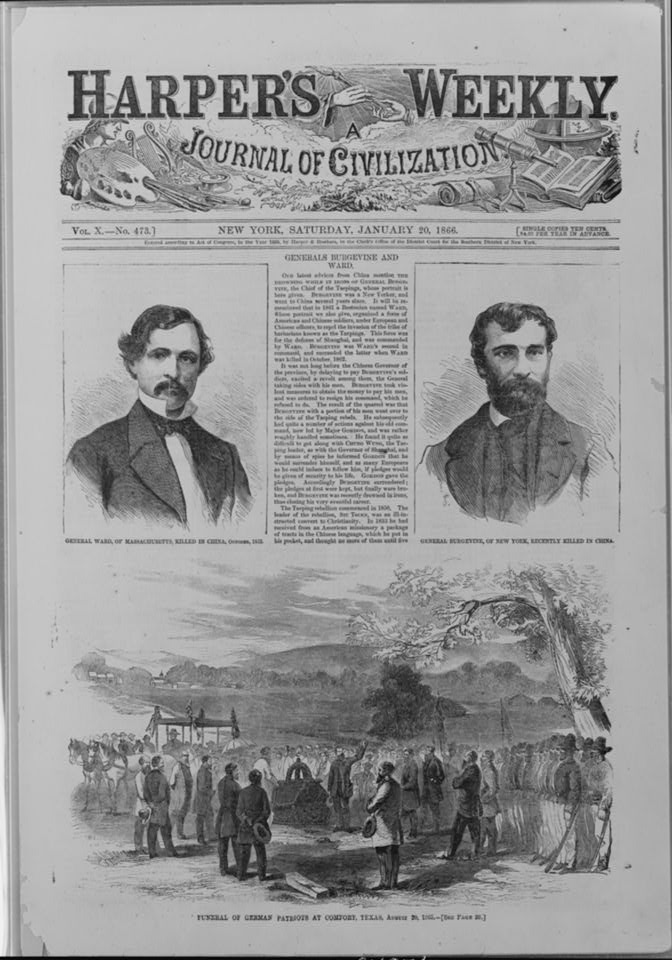
1866 story and illustration of Texan-German Unionists' funeral after the end of the American Civil War.

After the cessation of hostilities in 1865, Germans emerged as some of the most exuberant supporters of the United States' victory. The German-language Treue der Union Monument ("Loyalty to the Union"), in Comfort, Texas, was dedicated on August 10, 1866, to commemorate those who died at the 1862 Nueces massacre. Except for those drowned in the Rio Grande, the remains of the deceased are buried at the monument's site. It was the only Unionist monument dedicated by locals in the territory formerly controlled by the Confederacy.

=== Naming dispute ===
The proper name for the incident – the "Battle of Nueces" or the "Nueces Massacre" – has been contested since the engagement. Recently, historian Stanley McGowen has addressed both sides of the debate. He recognizes that the Germans were well-armed, judging by their ability to repulse a superior force. The initial engagement, then, can be called the Battle of the Nueces, but the execution of Germans following the battle, he states, lends credence to the title Nueces Massacre. No name has garnered definitive support, and McGowen admits the debate on Confederate and German actions continues among descendants on both sides of the incident.

== See also ==
- List of massacres in the United States
