= Ernst Kapp =

19th-century German-American philosopher of technology

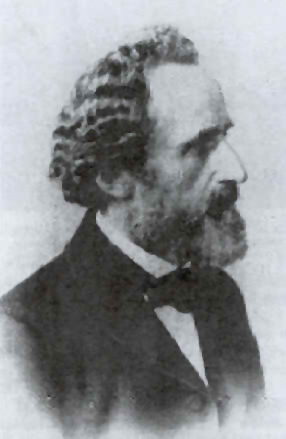
Ernst Kapp.

Ernst Christian Kapp (15 October 1808 – 30 January 1896) was a German-American philosopher of technology and geographer, and a follower of Carl Ritter.

He was prosecuted for sedition in the late 1840s for publishing a small article entitled 'Der konstituierte Despotismus und die konstitutionelle Freiheit' (1849) and was subsequently forced to leave Germany. He then emigrated to the German pioneer settlements of central Texas where he worked as a farmer, geographer and inventor.

He was one of the early German Free Thinkers in Sisterdale, Texas. In 1853, he was elected the President of the Freethinker abolitionist organization Die Freie Verein (The Free Society), which called for a meeting of abolitionist German Texans in conjunction with 14 May 1854 Staats-Saengerfest (State Singing Festival) in San Antonio, Texas. The convention adopted a political, social and religious platform, including:

1) Equal pay for equal work; 2) Direct election of the President of the United States; 3) Abolition of capital punishment; 4) Slavery is an evil, the abolition of which is a requirement of democratic principles...; 5) Free schools – including universities – supported by the state, without religious influence; and 6) Total separation of church and state.

After the Civil War he left the US for a visit to Germany, but fell ill during the voyage. Urged by his physician not to risk the return trip at his age, he re-entered the academic world.

Reflecting on his frontier experience, Kapp wrote "Grundlinien einer Philosophie der Technik" (Elements of a Philosophy of Technology) (1877). This work, among many other things, formulates a philosophy of technology in which tools and weapons are identified as different forms of 'organ projections', although this idea may have been loosely covered as early as Aristotle. Furthermore, in chapters 12 & 13, it notably analyses language and the state as extensions of mental life, long before such ideas were popularised by Marshall McLuhan.
