= 1936 United States presidential election in Texas =

- November 3, 1936

All 23 Texas votes to the Electoral College

| Nominee | Franklin D. Roosevelt | Alf Landon |
| Party | Democratic | Republican |
| Home state | New York | Kansas |
| Running mate | John Nance Garner | Frank Knox |
| Electoral vote | 23 | 0 |
| Popular vote | 739,952 | 104,661 |
| Percentage | 87.08% | 12.32% |
County results
Roosevelt
60–70%
70–80%
80–90%
90–100%
Landon
50–60%
60–70%
President before election
Franklin D. Roosevelt
Democratic
Elected President
Franklin D. Roosevelt
Democratic

The 1936 United States presidential election in Texas took place on November 3, 1936, as part of the 1936 United States presidential election. Texas voters chose 23 representatives, or electors, to the Electoral College, who voted for president and vice president.

Texas was won by incumbent President Franklin D. Roosevelt (D–New York), with 87.08% of the popular vote, over Governor Alf Landon (R–Kansas), with 12.32% of the popular vote, a landslide victory margin of 74.76%. Despite the overwhelming Democratic victory here, however, Landon performed better than fellow Republican Herbert Hoover had in 1932, with the state swinging approximately two points towards the GOP, and he managed to flip both Gillespie County and Kendall County back into the Republican column, the latter remaining with the party ever since.

By percentage of the popular vote won, Texas was Roosevelt's fifth-best state, behind South Carolina, Mississippi, Louisiana, and Georgia.

== Results ==
1936 United States presidential election in Texas
| Party | Candidate | Votes | % |
|---|---|---|---|
| Democratic | Franklin D. Roosevelt (inc.) | 739,952 (Note: This figure differs from either of those in America at the Polls and Géoelections.) | 87.08% |
| Republican | Alf Landon | 104,661 | 12.32% |
| Union | William Lemke | 3,281 | 0.39% |
| Socialist | Norman Thomas | 1,075 | 0.13% |
| Prohibition | D. Leigh Colvin | 514 (Note: This Prohibition Party vote was not included in the county tables for America at the Polls.) | 0.06% |
| Communist | Earl Browder | 253 | 0.03% |
| Total votes | | 849,736 | 100% |

=== Results by county ===
1936 United States presidential election in Texas by county
| County | Franklin D. Roosevelt Democratic | | Alf Landon Republican | | William Lemke Union | | Various candidates Other parties | | Margin | | Total votes cast |
| County | # | % | # | % | # | % | # | % | # | % | Total votes cast |
|---|---|---|---|---|---|---|---|---|---|---|---|
| Anderson | 3,749 | 92.80% | 289 | 7.15% | 0 | 0.00% | 2 | 0.05% | 3,460 | 85.64% | 4,040 |
| Andrews | 287 | 93.79% | 18 | 5.88% | 0 | 0.00% | 1 | 0.33% | 269 | 87.91% | 306 |
| Angelina | 3,943 | 91.91% | 342 | 7.97% | 1 | 0.02% | 4 | 0.09% | 3,601 | 83.94% | 4,290 |
| Aransas | 206 | 74.37% | 60 | 21.66% | 8 | 2.89% | 3 | 1.08% | 146 | 52.71% | 277 |
| Archer | 1,672 | 91.77% | 146 | 8.01% | 4 | 0.22% | 0 | 0.00% | 1,526 | 83.75% | 1,822 |
| Armstrong | 897 | 96.14% | 33 | 3.54% | 3 | 0.32% | 0 | 0.00% | 864 | 92.60% | 933 |
| Atascosa | 2,041 | 86.85% | 285 | 12.13% | 17 | 0.72% | 7 | 0.30% | 1,756 | 74.72% | 2,350 |
| Austin | 1,635 | 84.76% | 290 | 15.03% | 2 | 0.10% | 2 | 0.10% | 1,345 | 69.73% | 1,929 |
| Bailey | 788 | 79.36% | 191 | 19.23% | 10 | 1.01% | 4 | 0.40% | 597 | 60.12% | 993 |
| Bandera | 720 | 61.49% | 431 | 36.81% | 18 | 1.54% | 2 | 0.17% | 289 | 24.68% | 1,171 |
| Bastrop | 2,395 | 92.04% | 198 | 7.61% | 7 | 0.27% | 2 | 0.08% | 2,197 | 84.44% | 2,602 |
| Baylor | 1,541 | 93.85% | 100 | 6.09% | 0 | 0.00% | 1 | 0.06% | 1,441 | 87.76% | 1,642 |
| Bee | 1,462 | 70.22% | 603 | 28.96% | 11 | 0.53% | 6 | 0.29% | 859 | 41.26% | 2,082 |
| Bell | 6,119 | 92.42% | 475 | 7.17% | 21 | 0.32% | 6 | 0.09% | 5,644 | 85.24% | 6,621 |
| Bexar | 35,781 | 72.74% | 12,951 | 26.33% | 205 | 0.42% | 250 | 0.51% | 22,830 | 46.41% | 49,187 |
| Blanco | 1,056 | 76.97% | 313 | 22.81% | 0 | 0.00% | 3 | 0.22% | 743 | 54.15% | 1,372 |
| Borden | 220 | 88.71% | 26 | 10.48% | 1 | 0.40% | 1 | 0.40% | 194 | 78.23% | 248 |
| Bosque | 2,283 | 86.54% | 350 | 13.27% | 2 | 0.08% | 3 | 0.11% | 1,933 | 73.28% | 2,638 |
| Bowie | 5,030 | 91.11% | 472 | 8.55% | 12 | 0.22% | 7 | 0.13% | 4,558 | 82.56% | 5,521 |
| Brazoria | 2,284 | 82.01% | 462 | 16.59% | 29 | 1.04% | 10 | 0.36% | 1,822 | 65.42% | 2,785 |
| Brazos | 2,610 | 98.16% | 45 | 1.69% | 0 | 0.00% | 4 | 0.15% | 2,565 | 96.46% | 2,659 |
| Brewster | 828 | 84.40% | 151 | 15.39% | 2 | 0.20% | 0 | 0.00% | 677 | 69.01% | 981 |
| Briscoe | 849 | 92.99% | 64 | 7.01% | 0 | 0.00% | 0 | 0.00% | 785 | 85.98% | 913 |
| Brooks | 365 | 75.57% | 117 | 24.22% | 0 | 0.00% | 1 | 0.21% | 248 | 51.35% | 483 |
| Brown | 3,971 | 89.08% | 448 | 10.05% | 34 | 0.76% | 5 | 0.11% | 3,523 | 79.03% | 4,458 |
| Burleson | 1,466 | 91.57% | 135 | 8.43% | 0 | 0.00% | 0 | 0.00% | 1,331 | 83.14% | 1,601 |
| Burnet | 1,581 | 93.33% | 111 | 6.55% | 1 | 0.06% | 1 | 0.06% | 1,470 | 86.78% | 1,694 |
| Caldwell | 3,019 | 91.76% | 247 | 7.51% | 24 | 0.73% | 0 | 0.00% | 2,772 | 84.26% | 3,290 |
| Calhoun | 685 | 87.71% | 92 | 11.78% | 1 | 0.13% | 3 | 0.38% | 593 | 75.93% | 781 |
| Callahan | 1,739 | 87.34% | 245 | 12.31% | 2 | 0.10% | 5 | 0.25% | 1,494 | 75.04% | 1,991 |
| Cameron | 5,887 | 71.74% | 2,160 | 26.32% | 150 | 1.83% | 9 | 0.11% | 3,727 | 45.42% | 8,206 |
| Camp | 939 | 92.33% | 78 | 7.67% | 0 | 0.00% | 0 | 0.00% | 861 | 84.66% | 1,017 |
| Carson | 1,568 | 90.74% | 147 | 8.51% | 13 | 0.75% | 0 | 0.00% | 1,421 | 82.23% | 1,728 |
| Cass | 2,461 | 93.57% | 169 | 6.43% | 0 | 0.00% | 0 | 0.00% | 2,292 | 87.15% | 2,630 |
| Castro | 950 | 92.68% | 65 | 6.34% | 10 | 0.98% | 0 | 0.00% | 885 | 86.34% | 1,025 |
| Chambers | 984 | 87.78% | 134 | 11.95% | 2 | 0.18% | 1 | 0.09% | 850 | 75.83% | 1,121 |
| Cherokee | 3,908 | 92.65% | 302 | 7.16% | 3 | 0.07% | 5 | 0.12% | 3,606 | 85.49% | 4,218 |
| Childress | 2,076 | 89.99% | 209 | 9.06% | 13 | 0.56% | 9 | 0.39% | 1,867 | 80.93% | 2,307 |
| Clay | 2,168 | 91.09% | 196 | 8.24% | 11 | 0.46% | 5 | 0.21% | 1,972 | 82.86% | 2,380 |
| Cochran | 683 | 91.19% | 58 | 7.74% | 1 | 0.13% | 7 | 0.93% | 625 | 83.44% | 749 |
| Coke | 888 | 91.93% | 68 | 7.04% | 3 | 0.31% | 7 | 0.72% | 820 | 84.89% | 966 |
| Coleman | 2,900 | 91.28% | 269 | 8.47% | 4 | 0.13% | 4 | 0.13% | 2,631 | 82.81% | 3,177 |
| Collin | 5,669 | 91.29% | 531 | 8.55% | 2 | 0.03% | 8 | 0.13% | 5,138 | 82.74% | 6,210 |
| Collingsworth | 2,012 | 92.63% | 158 | 7.27% | 0 | 0.00% | 2 | 0.09% | 1,854 | 85.36% | 2,172 |
| Colorado | 1,435 | 79.06% | 372 | 20.50% | 3 | 0.17% | 5 | 0.28% | 1,063 | 58.57% | 1,815 |
| Comal | 1,611 | 74.21% | 554 | 25.52% | 4 | 0.18% | 2 | 0.09% | 1,057 | 48.69% | 2,171 |
| Comanche | 2,587 | 86.09% | 355 | 11.81% | 60 | 2.00% | 3 | 0.10% | 2,232 | 74.28% | 3,005 |
| Concho | 1,089 | 93.48% | 76 | 6.52% | 0 | 0.00% | 0 | 0.00% | 1,013 | 86.95% | 1,165 |
| Cooke | 3,686 | 83.93% | 686 | 15.62% | 12 | 0.27% | 8 | 0.18% | 3,000 | 68.31% | 4,392 |
| Coryell | 2,064 | 92.85% | 150 | 6.75% | 5 | 0.22% | 4 | 0.18% | 1,914 | 86.10% | 2,223 |
| Cottle | 1,265 | 93.08% | 86 | 6.33% | 5 | 0.37% | 3 | 0.22% | 1,179 | 86.75% | 1,359 |
| Crane | 622 | 96.14% | 25 | 3.86% | 0 | 0.00% | 0 | 0.00% | 597 | 92.27% | 647 |
| Crockett | 231 | 75.00% | 75 | 24.35% | 2 | 0.65% | 0 | 0.00% | 156 | 50.65% | 308 |
| Crosby | 1,711 | 91.64% | 153 | 8.19% | 3 | 0.16% | 0 | 0.00% | 1,558 | 83.45% | 1,867 |
| Culberson | 239 | 91.22% | 23 | 8.78% | 0 | 0.00% | 0 | 0.00% | 216 | 82.44% | 262 |
| Dallam | 1,436 | 83.15% | 220 | 12.74% | 68 | 3.94% | 3 | 0.17% | 1,216 | 70.41% | 1,727 |
| Dallas | 42,153 | 84.89% | 7,204 | 14.51% | 175 | 0.35% | 125 | 0.25% | 34,949 | 70.38% | 49,657 |
| Dawson | 1,829 | 91.82% | 156 | 7.83% | 6 | 0.30% | 1 | 0.05% | 1,673 | 83.99% | 1,992 |
| Deaf Smith | 1,236 | 89.11% | 142 | 10.24% | 9 | 0.65% | 0 | 0.00% | 1,094 | 78.88% | 1,387 |
| Delta | 1,466 | 94.64% | 82 | 5.29% | 1 | 0.06% | 0 | 0.00% | 1,384 | 89.35% | 1,549 |
| Denton | 5,021 | 90.91% | 476 | 8.62% | 15 | 0.27% | 11 | 0.20% | 4,545 | 82.29% | 5,523 |
| DeWitt | 1,977 | 75.98% | 616 | 23.67% | 1 | 0.04% | 8 | 0.31% | 1,361 | 52.31% | 2,602 |
| Dickens | 1,445 | 92.57% | 115 | 7.37% | 0 | 0.00% | 1 | 0.06% | 1,330 | 85.20% | 1,561 |
| Dimmit | 704 | 68.95% | 296 | 28.99% | 21 | 2.06% | 0 | 0.00% | 408 | 39.96% | 1,021 |
| Donley | 1,513 | 90.93% | 133 | 7.99% | 17 | 1.02% | 1 | 0.06% | 1,380 | 82.93% | 1,664 |
| Duval | 2,901 | 94.56% | 163 | 5.31% | 4 | 0.13% | 0 | 0.00% | 2,738 | 89.24% | 3,068 |
| Eastland | 4,659 | 85.99% | 724 | 13.36% | 17 | 0.31% | 18 | 0.33% | 3,935 | 72.63% | 5,418 |
| Ector | 816 | 89.87% | 81 | 8.92% | 10 | 1.10% | 1 | 0.11% | 735 | 80.95% | 908 |
| Edwards | 354 | 68.87% | 157 | 30.54% | 3 | 0.58% | 0 | 0.00% | 197 | 38.33% | 514 |
| Ellis | 5,644 | 94.46% | 319 | 5.34% | 4 | 0.07% | 8 | 0.13% | 5,325 | 89.12% | 5,975 |
| El Paso | 11,920 | 86.32% | 1,773 | 12.84% | 96 | 0.70% | 20 | 0.14% | 10,147 | 73.48% | 13,809 |
| Erath | 2,694 | 89.95% | 290 | 9.68% | 4 | 0.13% | 7 | 0.23% | 2,404 | 80.27% | 2,995 |
| Falls | 3,411 | 95.92% | 140 | 3.94% | 0 | 0.00% | 5 | 0.14% | 3,271 | 91.99% | 3,556 |
| Fannin | 5,242 | 93.32% | 368 | 6.55% | 1 | 0.02% | 6 | 0.11% | 4,874 | 86.77% | 5,617 |
| Fayette | 2,820 | 82.46% | 595 | 17.40% | 4 | 0.12% | 1 | 0.03% | 2,225 | 65.06% | 3,420 |
| Fisher | 2,068 | 92.78% | 155 | 6.95% | 2 | 0.09% | 4 | 0.18% | 1,913 | 85.82% | 2,229 |
| Floyd | 1,863 | 88.93% | 217 | 10.36% | 14 | 0.67% | 1 | 0.05% | 1,646 | 78.57% | 2,095 |
| Foard | 928 | 92.34% | 74 | 7.36% | 2 | 0.20% | 1 | 0.10% | 854 | 84.98% | 1,005 |
| Fort Bend | 2,588 | 93.26% | 176 | 6.34% | 9 | 0.32% | 2 | 0.07% | 2,412 | 86.92% | 2,775 |
| Franklin | 925 | 90.95% | 90 | 8.85% | 1 | 0.10% | 1 | 0.10% | 835 | 82.10% | 1,017 |
| Freestone | 1,929 | 93.23% | 134 | 6.48% | 0 | 0.00% | 6 | 0.29% | 1,795 | 86.76% | 2,069 |
| Frio | 1,019 | 83.59% | 193 | 15.83% | 7 | 0.57% | 0 | 0.00% | 826 | 67.76% | 1,219 |
| Gaines | 680 | 93.66% | 42 | 5.79% | 0 | 0.00% | 4 | 0.55% | 638 | 87.88% | 726 |
| Galveston | 9,370 | 84.37% | 1,666 | 15.00% | 44 | 0.40% | 26 | 0.23% | 7,704 | 69.37% | 11,106 |
| Garza | 807 | 85.67% | 132 | 14.01% | 2 | 0.21% | 1 | 0.11% | 675 | 71.66% | 942 |
| Gillespie | 1,016 | 40.41% | 1,421 | 56.52% | 69 | 2.74% | 8 | 0.32% | -405 | -16.11% | 2,514 |
| Glasscock | 252 | 89.05% | 29 | 10.25% | 0 | 0.00% | 2 | 0.71% | 223 | 78.80% | 283 |
| Goliad | 1,184 | 78.36% | 323 | 21.38% | 2 | 0.13% | 2 | 0.13% | 861 | 56.98% | 1,511 |
| Gonzales | 2,674 | 88.16% | 352 | 11.61% | 3 | 0.10% | 4 | 0.13% | 2,322 | 76.56% | 3,033 |
| Gray | 4,347 | 89.83% | 464 | 9.59% | 21 | 0.43% | 7 | 0.14% | 3,883 | 80.24% | 4,839 |
| Grayson | 10,627 | 91.64% | 947 | 8.17% | 12 | 0.10% | 11 | 0.09% | 9,680 | 83.47% | 11,597 |
| Gregg | 6,489 | 91.12% | 621 | 8.72% | 6 | 0.08% | 5 | 0.07% | 5,868 | 82.40% | 7,121 |
| Grimes | 1,851 | 93.06% | 136 | 6.84% | 0 | 0.00% | 2 | 0.10% | 1,715 | 86.22% | 1,989 |
| Guadalupe | 2,962 | 69.91% | 1,266 | 29.88% | 3 | 0.07% | 6 | 0.14% | 1,696 | 40.03% | 4,237 |
| Hale | 3,109 | 86.80% | 451 | 12.59% | 12 | 0.34% | 10 | 0.28% | 2,658 | 74.20% | 3,582 |
| Hall | 2,195 | 93.56% | 126 | 5.37% | 20 | 0.85% | 5 | 0.21% | 2,069 | 88.19% | 2,346 |
| Hamilton | 1,929 | 90.48% | 202 | 9.47% | 0 | 0.00% | 1 | 0.05% | 1,727 | 81.00% | 2,132 |
| Hansford | 826 | 89.69% | 74 | 8.03% | 16 | 1.74% | 5 | 0.54% | 752 | 81.65% | 921 |
| Hardeman | 1,991 | 90.17% | 207 | 9.38% | 7 | 0.32% | 3 | 0.14% | 1,784 | 80.80% | 2,208 |
| Hardin | 2,351 | 95.18% | 119 | 4.82% | 0 | 0.00% | 0 | 0.00% | 2,232 | 90.36% | 2,470 |
| Harris | 59,205 | 87.67% | 8,083 | 11.97% | 109 | 0.16% | 136 | 0.20% | 51,122 | 75.70% | 67,533 |
| Harrison | 3,400 | 91.69% | 302 | 8.14% | 0 | 0.00% | 6 | 0.16% | 3,098 | 83.55% | 3,708 |
| Hartley | 560 | 93.33% | 40 | 6.67% | 0 | 0.00% | 0 | 0.00% | 520 | 86.67% | 600 |
| Haskell | 2,713 | 94.46% | 156 | 5.43% | 2 | 0.07% | 1 | 0.03% | 2,557 | 89.03% | 2,872 |
| Hays | 1,964 | 86.94% | 286 | 12.66% | 9 | 0.40% | 0 | 0.00% | 1,678 | 74.28% | 2,259 |
| Hemphill | 1,008 | 88.89% | 121 | 10.67% | 5 | 0.44% | 0 | 0.00% | 887 | 78.22% | 1,134 |
| Henderson | 3,259 | 92.45% | 260 | 7.38% | 0 | 0.00% | 6 | 0.17% | 2,999 | 85.08% | 3,525 |
| Hidalgo | 6,782 | 67.46% | 2,962 | 29.46% | 285 | 2.83% | 24 | 0.24% | 3,820 | 38.00% | 10,053 |
| Hill | 4,710 | 94.58% | 265 | 5.32% | 4 | 0.08% | 1 | 0.02% | 4,445 | 89.26% | 4,980 |
| Hockley | 1,731 | 94.44% | 90 | 4.91% | 2 | 0.11% | 10 | 0.55% | 1,641 | 89.53% | 1,833 |
| Hood | 988 | 90.31% | 102 | 9.32% | 3 | 0.27% | 1 | 0.09% | 886 | 80.99% | 1,094 |
| Hopkins | 2,753 | 91.22% | 261 | 8.65% | 0 | 0.00% | 4 | 0.13% | 2,492 | 82.57% | 3,018 |
| Houston | 2,458 | 96.05% | 99 | 3.87% | 1 | 0.04% | 1 | 0.04% | 2,359 | 92.18% | 2,559 |
| Howard | 3,094 | 92.75% | 230 | 6.89% | 4 | 0.12% | 8 | 0.24% | 2,864 | 85.85% | 3,336 |
| Hudspeth | 363 | 93.56% | 24 | 6.19% | 0 | 0.00% | 1 | 0.26% | 339 | 87.37% | 388 |
| Hunt | 5,801 | 94.37% | 335 | 5.45% | 7 | 0.11% | 4 | 0.07% | 5,466 | 88.92% | 6,147 |
| Hutchinson | 2,478 | 86.25% | 390 | 13.57% | 1 | 0.03% | 4 | 0.14% | 2,088 | 72.68% | 2,873 |
| Irion | 476 | 89.81% | 49 | 9.25% | 0 | 0.00% | 5 | 0.94% | 427 | 80.57% | 530 |
| Jack | 1,113 | 85.22% | 183 | 14.01% | 7 | 0.54% | 3 | 0.23% | 930 | 71.21% | 1,306 |
| Jackson | 952 | 84.40% | 171 | 15.16% | 4 | 0.35% | 1 | 0.09% | 781 | 69.24% | 1,128 |
| Jasper | 1,500 | 93.05% | 109 | 6.76% | 3 | 0.19% | 0 | 0.00% | 1,391 | 86.29% | 1,612 |
| Jeff Davis | 291 | 89.54% | 33 | 10.15% | 1 | 0.31% | 0 | 0.00% | 258 | 79.38% | 325 |
| Jefferson | 18,187 | 87.40% | 2,544 | 12.23% | 32 | 0.15% | 45 | 0.22% | 15,643 | 75.18% | 20,808 |
| Jim Hogg | 712 | 93.68% | 48 | 6.32% | 0 | 0.00% | 0 | 0.00% | 664 | 87.37% | 760 |
| Jim Wells | 1,691 | 82.97% | 338 | 16.58% | 7 | 0.34% | 2 | 0.10% | 1,353 | 66.39% | 2,038 |
| Johnson | 4,281 | 92.12% | 337 | 7.25% | 24 | 0.52% | 5 | 0.11% | 3,944 | 84.87% | 4,647 |
| Jones | 3,396 | 91.71% | 305 | 8.24% | 0 | 0.00% | 2 | 0.05% | 3,091 | 83.47% | 3,703 |
| Karnes | 2,067 | 84.47% | 371 | 15.16% | 8 | 0.33% | 1 | 0.04% | 1,696 | 69.31% | 2,447 |
| Kaufman | 3,943 | 94.44% | 229 | 5.49% | 1 | 0.02% | 2 | 0.05% | 3,714 | 88.96% | 4,175 |
| Kendall | 405 | 36.68% | 693 | 62.77% | 4 | 0.36% | 2 | 0.18% | -288 | -26.09% | 1,104 |
| Kenedy | 96 | 76.19% | 30 | 23.81% | 0 | 0.00% | 0 | 0.00% | 66 | 52.38% | 126 |
| Kent | 533 | 94.50% | 31 | 5.50% | 0 | 0.00% | 0 | 0.00% | 502 | 89.01% | 564 |
| Kerr | 1,586 | 61.26% | 994 | 38.39% | 8 | 0.31% | 1 | 0.04% | 592 | 22.87% | 2,589 |
| Kimble | 681 | 81.75% | 151 | 18.13% | 0 | 0.00% | 1 | 0.12% | 530 | 63.63% | 833 |
| King | 211 | 94.20% | 13 | 5.80% | 0 | 0.00% | 0 | 0.00% | 198 | 88.39% | 224 |
| Kinney | 357 | 67.11% | 175 | 32.89% | 0 | 0.00% | 0 | 0.00% | 182 | 34.21% | 532 |
| Kleberg | 1,488 | 87.12% | 156 | 9.13% | 61 | 3.57% | 3 | 0.18% | 1,332 | 77.99% | 1,708 |
| Knox | 1,823 | 91.15% | 171 | 8.55% | 1 | 0.05% | 5 | 0.25% | 1,652 | 82.60% | 2,000 |
| Lamar | 5,621 | 94.65% | 308 | 5.19% | 10 | 0.17% | 0 | 0.00% | 5,313 | 89.46% | 5,939 |
| Lamb | 2,320 | 88.21% | 300 | 11.41% | 4 | 0.15% | 6 | 0.23% | 2,020 | 76.81% | 2,630 |
| Lampasas | 1,462 | 91.43% | 134 | 8.38% | 3 | 0.19% | 0 | 0.00% | 1,328 | 83.05% | 1,599 |
| La Salle | 704 | 90.49% | 74 | 9.51% | 0 | 0.00% | 0 | 0.00% | 630 | 80.98% | 778 |
| Lavaca | 2,204 | 84.12% | 403 | 15.38% | 10 | 0.38% | 3 | 0.11% | 1,801 | 68.74% | 2,620 |
| Lee | 1,155 | 80.94% | 271 | 18.99% | 0 | 0.00% | 1 | 0.07% | 884 | 61.95% | 1,427 |
| Leon | 1,748 | 94.69% | 97 | 5.25% | 0 | 0.00% | 1 | 0.05% | 1,651 | 89.44% | 1,846 |
| Liberty | 2,813 | 91.69% | 244 | 7.95% | 6 | 0.20% | 5 | 0.16% | 2,569 | 83.74% | 3,068 |
| Limestone | 3,857 | 95.05% | 196 | 4.83% | 4 | 0.10% | 1 | 0.02% | 3,661 | 90.22% | 4,058 |
| Lipscomb | 973 | 77.65% | 273 | 21.79% | 4 | 0.32% | 3 | 0.24% | 700 | 55.87% | 1,253 |
| Live Oak | 874 | 76.33% | 231 | 20.17% | 32 | 2.79% | 8 | 0.70% | 643 | 56.16% | 1,145 |
| Llano | 1,302 | 92.41% | 107 | 7.59% | 0 | 0.00% | 0 | 0.00% | 1,195 | 84.81% | 1,409 |
| Loving | 118 | 72.39% | 21 | 12.88% | 19 | 11.66% | 5 | 3.07% | 97 | 59.51% | 163 |
| Lubbock | 6,425 | 90.97% | 622 | 8.81% | 11 | 0.16% | 5 | 0.07% | 5,803 | 82.16% | 7,063 |
| Lynn | 1,983 | 91.89% | 169 | 7.83% | 0 | 0.00% | 6 | 0.28% | 1,814 | 84.06% | 2,158 |
| McCulloch | 1,722 | 83.55% | 323 | 15.67% | 7 | 0.34% | 9 | 0.44% | 1,399 | 67.88% | 2,061 |
| McLennan | 12,489 | 90.77% | 1,116 | 8.11% | 115 | 0.84% | 39 | 0.28% | 11,373 | 82.66% | 13,759 |
| McMullen | 265 | 87.75% | 37 | 12.25% | 0 | 0.00% | 0 | 0.00% | 228 | 75.50% | 302 |
| Madison | 1,127 | 96.16% | 45 | 3.84% | 0 | 0.00% | 0 | 0.00% | 1,082 | 92.32% | 1,172 |
| Marion | 919 | 87.69% | 129 | 12.31% | 0 | 0.00% | 0 | 0.00% | 790 | 75.38% | 1,048 |
| Martin | 775 | 90.75% | 70 | 8.20% | 8 | 0.94% | 1 | 0.12% | 705 | 82.55% | 854 |
| Mason | 787 | 68.61% | 359 | 31.30% | 1 | 0.09% | 0 | 0.00% | 428 | 37.31% | 1,147 |
| Matagorda | 1,700 | 78.56% | 459 | 21.21% | 3 | 0.14% | 2 | 0.09% | 1,241 | 57.35% | 2,164 |
| Maverick | 890 | 81.20% | 166 | 15.15% | 37 | 3.38% | 3 | 0.27% | 724 | 66.06% | 1,096 |
| Medina | 2,050 | 67.63% | 969 | 31.97% | 10 | 0.33% | 2 | 0.07% | 1,081 | 35.66% | 3,031 |
| Menard | 734 | 86.05% | 115 | 13.48% | 1 | 0.12% | 3 | 0.35% | 619 | 72.57% | 853 |
| Midland | 1,229 | 86.06% | 190 | 13.31% | 8 | 0.56% | 1 | 0.07% | 1,039 | 72.76% | 1,428 |
| Milam | 4,077 | 93.02% | 288 | 6.57% | 0 (Note: This zero vote total for Lemke is assumed given that no additional votes beyond the Géoelections total are required to give his figures as shown in America at the Polls.) | 0.00% | 18 | 0.41% | 3,789 | 86.45% | 4,383 |
| Mills | 1,005 | 85.90% | 165 | 14.10% | 0 | 0.00% | 0 | 0.00% | 840 | 71.79% | 1,170 |
| Mitchell | 2,035 | 91.21% | 192 | 8.61% | 1 | 0.04% | 3 | 0.13% | 1,843 | 82.61% | 2,231 |
| Montague | 2,789 | 89.16% | 324 | 10.36% | 0 | 0.00% | 15 | 0.48% | 2,465 | 78.80% | 3,128 |
| Montgomery | 2,443 | 92.61% | 186 | 7.05% | 2 | 0.08% | 7 | 0.27% | 2,257 | 85.56% | 2,638 |
| Moore | 583 | 92.39% | 47 | 7.45% | 0 | 0.00% | 1 | 0.16% | 536 | 84.94% | 631 |
| Morris | 1,220 | 95.91% | 52 | 4.09% | 0 | 0.00% | 0 | 0.00% | 1,168 | 91.82% | 1,272 |
| Motley | 867 | 92.93% | 64 | 6.86% | 1 | 0.11% | 1 | 0.11% | 803 | 86.07% | 933 |
| Nacogdoches | 4,075 | 95.01% | 209 | 4.87% | 2 | 0.05% | 3 | 0.07% | 3,866 | 90.14% | 4,289 |
| Navarro | 5,815 | 95.02% | 293 | 4.79% | 9 | 0.15% | 3 | 0.05% | 5,522 | 90.23% | 6,120 |
| Newton | 1,111 | 92.12% | 93 | 7.71% | 1 | 0.08% | 1 | 0.08% | 1,018 | 84.41% | 1,206 |
| Nolan | 2,913 | 91.15% | 268 | 8.39% | 11 | 0.34% | 4 | 0.13% | 2,645 | 82.76% | 3,196 |
| Nueces | 6,597 | 83.09% | 1,234 | 15.54% | 104 | 1.31% | 5 | 0.06% | 5,363 | 67.54% | 7,940 |
| Ochiltree | 1,111 | 88.03% | 109 | 8.64% | 41 | 3.25% | 1 | 0.08% | 1,002 | 79.40% | 1,262 |
| Oldham | 437 | 94.59% | 20 | 4.33% | 5 | 1.08% | 0 | 0.00% | 417 | 90.26% | 462 |
| Orange | 2,281 | 92.01% | 190 | 7.66% | 3 | 0.12% | 5 | 0.20% | 2,091 | 84.35% | 2,479 |
| Palo Pinto | 2,738 | 87.67% | 371 | 11.88% | 9 | 0.29% | 5 | 0.16% | 2,367 | 75.79% | 3,123 |
| Panola | 2,425 | 95.36% | 95 | 3.74% | 1 | 0.04% | 22 | 0.87% | 2,330 | 91.62% | 2,543 |
| Parker | 2,493 | 86.08% | 375 | 12.95% | 13 | 0.45% | 15 | 0.52% | 2,118 | 73.14% | 2,896 |
| Parmer | 936 | 86.83% | 135 | 12.52% | 4 | 0.37% | 3 | 0.28% | 801 | 74.30% | 1,078 |
| Pecos | 1,330 | 88.79% | 167 | 11.15% | 0 | 0.00% | 1 | 0.07% | 1,163 | 77.64% | 1,498 |
| Polk | 1,618 | 91.93% | 141 | 8.01% | 0 | 0.00% | 1 | 0.06% | 1,477 | 83.92% | 1,760 |
| Potter | 6,496 | 84.99% | 1,018 | 13.32% | 117 | 1.53% | 12 | 0.16% | 5,478 | 71.67% | 7,643 |
| Presidio | 938 | 89.42% | 106 | 10.10% | 2 | 0.19% | 3 | 0.29% | 832 | 79.31% | 1,049 |
| Rains | 676 | 91.23% | 63 | 8.50% | 1 | 0.13% | 1 | 0.13% | 613 | 82.73% | 741 |
| Randall | 1,656 | 91.80% | 142 | 7.87% | 3 | 0.17% | 3 | 0.17% | 1,514 | 83.92% | 1,804 |
| Reagan | 477 | 87.85% | 66 | 12.15% | 0 | 0.00% | 0 | 0.00% | 411 | 75.69% | 543 |
| Real | 210 | 79.25% | 55 | 20.75% | 0 | 0.00% | 0 | 0.00% | 155 | 58.49% | 265 |
| Red River | 2,685 | 93.00% | 199 | 6.89% | 0 | 0.00% | 3 | 0.10% | 2,486 | 86.11% | 2,887 |
| Reeves | 1,127 | 91.70% | 100 | 8.14% | 1 | 0.08% | 1 | 0.08% | 1,027 | 83.56% | 1,229 |
| Refugio | 1,058 | 81.07% | 242 | 18.54% | 5 | 0.38% | 0 | 0.00% | 816 | 62.53% | 1,305 |
| Roberts | 426 | 94.04% | 27 | 5.96% | 0 | 0.00% | 0 | 0.00% | 399 | 88.08% | 453 |
| Robertson | 2,633 | 96.77% | 86 | 3.16% | 2 | 0.07% | 0 | 0.00% | 2,547 | 93.61% | 2,721 |
| Rockwall | 1,168 | 97.74% | 26 | 2.18% | 1 | 0.08% | 0 | 0.00% | 1,142 | 95.56% | 1,195 |
| Runnels | 2,985 | 89.99% | 313 | 9.44% | 10 | 0.30% | 9 | 0.27% | 2,672 | 80.55% | 3,317 |
| Rusk | 6,107 | 93.27% | 433 | 6.61% | 4 | 0.06% | 4 | 0.06% | 5,674 | 86.65% | 6,548 |
| Sabine | 1,216 | 91.70% | 108 | 8.14% | 0 | 0.00% | 2 | 0.15% | 1,108 | 83.56% | 1,326 |
| San Augustine | 1,054 | 94.28% | 64 | 5.72% | 0 | 0.00% | 0 | 0.00% | 990 | 88.55% | 1,118 |
| San Jacinto | 564 | 89.38% | 67 | 10.62% | 0 | 0.00% | 0 | 0.00% | 497 | 78.76% | 631 |
| San Patricio | 2,213 | 81.21% | 482 | 17.69% | 24 | 0.88% | 6 | 0.22% | 1,731 | 63.52% | 2,725 |
| San Saba | 1,505 | 90.99% | 147 | 8.89% | 1 | 0.06% | 1 | 0.06% | 1,358 | 82.10% | 1,654 |
| Schleicher | 469 | 85.58% | 78 | 14.23% | 0 | 0.00% | 1 | 0.18% | 391 | 71.35% | 548 |
| Scurry | 1,746 | 91.32% | 162 | 8.47% | 3 | 0.16% | 1 | 0.05% | 1,584 | 82.85% | 1,912 |
| Shackelford | 1,153 | 88.35% | 152 | 11.65% | 0 | 0.00% | 0 | 0.00% | 1,001 | 76.70% | 1,305 |
| Shelby | 3,167 | 95.62% | 136 | 4.11% | 0 | 0.00% | 9 | 0.27% | 3,031 | 91.52% | 3,312 |
| Sherman | 568 | 94.35% | 34 | 5.65% | 0 | 0.00% | 0 | 0.00% | 534 | 88.70% | 602 |
| Smith | 7,116 | 91.37% | 660 | 8.47% | 6 | 0.08% | 6 | 0.08% | 6,456 | 82.90% | 7,788 |
| Somervell | 317 | 83.86% | 57 | 15.08% | 3 | 0.79% | 1 | 0.26% | 260 | 68.78% | 378 |
| Starr | 2,289 | 87.43% | 320 | 12.22% | 3 | 0.11% | 6 | 0.23% | 1,969 | 75.21% | 2,618 |
| Stephens | 2,380 | 77.27% | 681 | 22.11% | 13 | 0.42% | 6 | 0.19% | 1,699 | 55.16% | 3,080 |
| Sterling | 384 | 96.48% | 14 | 3.52% | 0 | 0.00% | 0 | 0.00% | 370 | 92.96% | 398 |
| Stonewall | 1,001 | 94.34% | 59 | 5.56% | 0 | 0.00% | 1 | 0.09% | 942 | 88.78% | 1,061 |
| Sutton | 398 | 86.15% | 64 | 13.85% | 0 | 0.00% | 0 | 0.00% | 334 | 72.29% | 462 |
| Swisher | 1,453 | 90.98% | 140 | 8.77% | 3 | 0.19% | 1 | 0.06% | 1,313 | 82.22% | 1,597 |
| Tarrant | 29,791 | 88.24% | 3,781 | 11.20% | 139 | 0.41% | 51 | 0.15% | 26,010 | 77.04% | 33,762 |
| Taylor | 6,169 | 89.43% | 678 | 9.83% | 6 | 0.09% | 45 | 0.65% | 5,491 | 79.60% | 6,898 |
| Terrell | 324 | 79.41% | 84 | 20.59% | 0 | 0.00% | 0 | 0.00% | 240 | 58.82% | 408 |
| Terry | 1,619 | 94.18% | 87 | 5.06% | 11 | 0.64% | 2 | 0.12% | 1,532 | 89.12% | 1,719 |
| Throckmorton | 949 | 87.63% | 132 | 12.19% | 1 | 0.09% | 1 | 0.09% | 817 | 75.44% | 1,083 |
| Titus | 1,872 | 95.90% | 77 | 3.94% | 0 | 0.00% | 3 | 0.15% | 1,795 | 91.96% | 1,952 |
| Tom Green | 4,803 | 87.34% | 627 | 11.40% | 50 | 0.91% | 19 | 0.35% | 4,176 | 75.94% | 5,499 |
| Travis | 12,092 | 90.07% | 1,154 | 8.60% | 141 | 1.05% | 38 | 0.28% | 10,938 | 81.47% | 13,425 |
| Trinity | 1,196 | 88.72% | 151 | 11.20% | 1 | 0.07% | 0 | 0.00% | 1,045 | 77.52% | 1,348 |
| Tyler | 1,076 | 90.27% | 116 | 9.73% | 0 | 0.00% | 0 | 0.00% | 960 | 80.54% | 1,192 |
| Upshur | 2,243 | 87.38% | 321 | 12.50% | 0 | 0.00% | 3 | 0.12% | 1,922 | 74.87% | 2,567 |
| Upton | 728 | 89.54% | 81 | 9.96% | 2 | 0.25% | 2 | 0.25% | 647 | 79.58% | 813 |
| Uvalde | 1,743 | 83.08% | 354 | 16.87% | 1 | 0.05% | 0 | 0.00% | 1,389 | 66.21% | 2,098 |
| Val Verde | 1,262 | 71.26% | 504 | 28.46% | 3 | 0.17% | 2 | 0.11% | 758 | 42.80% | 1,771 |
| Van Zandt | 3,257 | 92.24% | 245 | 6.94% | 11 | 0.31% | 18 | 0.51% | 3,012 | 85.30% | 3,531 |
| Victoria | 2,081 | 85.46% | 352 | 14.46% | 2 (Note: The figures for this county are different from those in Géoelections because America at the Polls suggests there must have been five or six fewer Lemke votes than the Géoelections sum.) | 0.08% | 0 | 0.00% | 1,729 | 71.01% | 2,435 |
| Walker | 1,715 | 96.02% | 69 | 3.86% | 0 | 0.00% | 2 | 0.11% | 1,646 | 92.16% | 1,786 |
| Waller | 889 | 88.72% | 111 | 11.08% | 0 | 0.00% | 2 | 0.20% | 778 | 77.64% | 1,002 |
| Ward | 1,113 | 91.76% | 98 | 8.08% | 2 | 0.16% | 0 | 0.00% | 1,015 | 83.68% | 1,213 |
| Washington | 1,993 | 91.72% | 176 | 8.10% | 1 | 0.05% | 3 | 0.14% | 1,817 | 83.62% | 2,173 |
| Webb | 3,594 | 83.78% | 696 | 16.22% | 0 | 0.00% | 0 | 0.00% | 2,898 | 67.55% | 4,290 |
| Wharton | 3,034 | 90.43% | 307 | 9.15% | 7 | 0.21% | 7 | 0.21% | 2,727 | 81.28% | 3,355 |
| Wheeler | 2,415 | 89.38% | 277 | 10.25% | 8 | 0.30% | 2 | 0.07% | 2,138 | 79.13% | 2,702 |
| Wichita | 9,428 | 87.39% | 1,327 | 12.30% | 20 | 0.19% | 13 | 0.12% | 8,101 | 75.09% | 10,788 |
| Wilbarger | 3,279 | 90.76% | 316 | 8.75% | 15 | 0.42% | 3 | 0.08% | 2,963 | 82.01% | 3,613 |
| Willacy | 1,002 | 71.62% | 376 | 26.88% | 19 | 1.36% | 2 | 0.14% | 626 | 44.75% | 1,399 |
| Williamson | 4,995 | 92.79% | 375 | 6.97% | 3 | 0.06% | 10 | 0.19% | 4,620 | 85.83% | 5,383 |
| Wilson | 2,573 | 89.84% | 286 | 9.99% | 1 | 0.03% | 4 | 0.14% | 2,287 | 79.85% | 2,864 |
| Winkler | 903 | 92.62% | 63 | 6.46% | 4 | 0.41% | 5 | 0.51% | 840 | 86.15% | 975 |
| Wise | 2,737 | 88.58% | 348 | 11.26% | 2 | 0.06% | 3 | 0.10% | 2,389 | 77.31% | 3,090 |
| Wood | 2,751 | 93.25% | 192 | 6.51% | 1 | 0.03% | 6 | 0.20% | 2,559 | 86.75% | 2,950 |
| Yoakum | 227 | 92.65% | 13 | 5.31% | 3 | 1.22% | 2 | 0.82% | 214 | 87.35% | 245 |
| Young | 3,065 | 90.65% | 304 | 8.99% | 7 | 0.21% | 5 | 0.15% | 2,761 | 81.66% | 3,381 |
| Zapata | 282 | 89.24% | 34 | 10.76% | 0 | 0.00% | 0 | 0.00% | 248 | 78.48% | 316 |
| Zavala | 788 | 78.64% | 209 | 20.86% | 3 | 0.30% | 2 | 0.20% | 579 | 57.78% | 1,002 |
| Totals | 739,900 | 87.06% | 104,661 | 12.32% | 3,187 | 0.38% | 1,583 | 0.19% | 635,239 | 74.79% | 849,845 |

==== Counties that flipped from Democratic to Republican ====
- Gillespie
- Kendall

== See also ==
- United States presidential elections in Texas
