= George Wilkins Kendall =

American journalist (1809–1867)

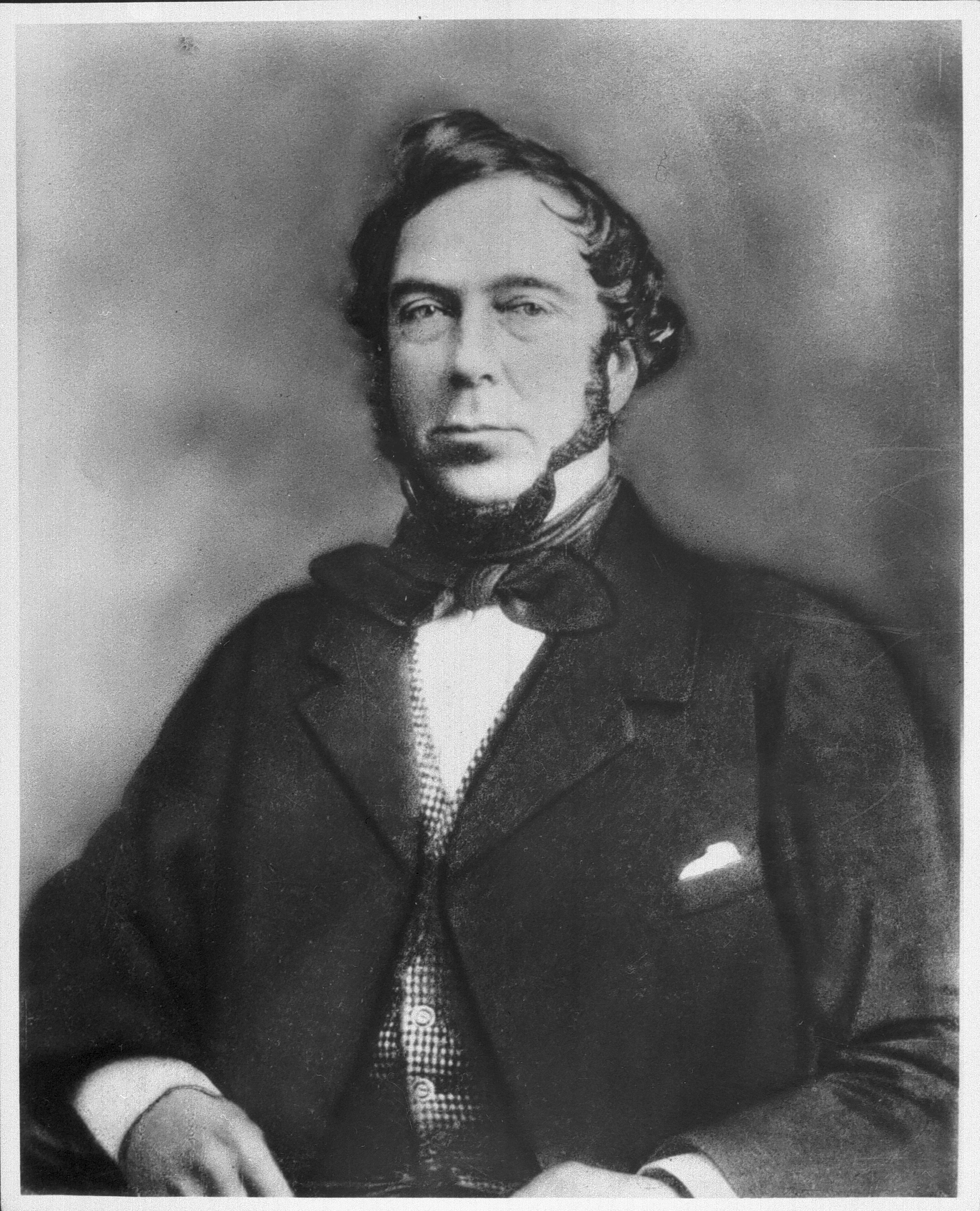
- Portrait of George W. Kendall.
- Born: George Wilkins Kendall; August 22, 1809; Mont Vernon, New Hampshire, US
- Died: October 21, 1867 (aged 58); Boerne, Texas, US
- Resting place: Boerne Cemetery
- Known for: War correspondent Pioneer Texas sheep ranching
- Spouse: Adeline Suzanne de Valcourt
- Children: Four
- Parents: Thaddeus Kendall (father); Abigail Wilkins Kendall (mother)
- Relatives: John Hubbard Wilkins (uncle)

George Wilkins Kendall (1809–1867) was a journalist, war correspondent, and pioneer Texas sheepman, known as the father of the Texas sheep business. Kendall County, Texas is named for him. In 1837, Kendall and Francis Lumsden established The New Orleans Picayune newspaper. By 1838, the paper had extended its coverage to the Republic of Texas. Kendall was given a Recorded Texas Historic Landmark in 1989, Marker number 2169, as a gravestone. During the Civil War, Kendall produced wool for Confederate uniforms and blankets.

== Early years ==
He was the eldest of five children born to Thaddeus Kendall and his second wife, Abigail Wilkins Kendall. Both parents descended from prominent Puritan families of noble origin who immigrated to Massachusetts from Wales, Scotland, and England in the 17th century. His ancestors played a role in the founding of the New Hampshire Province in the 18th century. Several close relatives held government, religious, and military positions during the American Revolutionary War.

Much of his childhood was spent under the guardianship of his grandfather, Deacon Samuel Wilkins (one of the most influential men in the region). Though his formal schooling was brief, his inquisitive nature and passion for reading led him to develop, largely through self-education, notable skills in fields such as geography and communication.

In his youth, he briefly ventured into theater as both an actor and playwright, refining a sharp sense of humor and cultivating his natural talent for storytelling.

== Career ==
=== Journalism ===
Kendall learned printing as a youth at Burlington, Vermont. He began earning his own living at age 14, working in Washington, D.C., and in New York City for Horace Greeley. In 1825, Kendall apprenticed at the Amherst Herald, and in 1832 he wrote for the Mobile Alabama Register. In 1837, Kendall and Francis Lumsden established The New Orleans Picayune, which initially sold for the 6 1/4 cent Spanish coin. By 1838, the paper had extended its coverage to the Republic of Texas. Kendall and Lumsden began a pony express to link the paper to other newspapers in the East.

=== Soldier and war correspondent ===
Kendall traveled to the Republic of Texas in 1841 and joined the Texan Santa Fe Expedition, which had been initiated by the republic's President Mirabeau B. Lamar in order to gain control over the Santa Fe Trail and to secure Texas claims to New Mexico. The expedition turned to disaster, and near present-day Tucumcari, New Mexico, the men surrendered to the Mexican military. The prisoners were marched 2,000 miles to Mexico City and confined in a leper colony, with Kendall suffering smallpox. Kendall posted detailed letters during his imprisonment, twenty-three of which were subsequently published in The Picayune over a period of a year. Kendall was released in 1842, as a result of intervention by influential friends. In 1844, he published a 900-page book, Narrative of an Expedition Across the Great Southwestern Prairies, from Texas to Santa Fé, which sold 40,000 copies over eight years.

The New Orleans Picayune began to advocate for westward expansion, annexation of Texas, and war with Mexico. In 1846, Kendall enlisted in the Texas Rangers under Captain Benjamin McCulloch, which fought under General Zachary Taylor at the Rio Grande. He had coordinated a series of couriers and steamboats to carry his reports back to the newspaper. Kendall saw action at the Battle of Monterrey, becoming a war correspondent. As a correspondent, he traveled with General William Jenkins Worth and documented the Veracruz landing of General Winfield Scott. Kendall sustained a knee wound in the Battle of Chapultepec. By the end of the 1846–1848 Mexican–American War, Kendall had filed 214 reports. He became the best-known correspondent of that war. His dispatches have been collected and republished in a modern, scholarly edition.

After the war Kendall took a European sabbatical for several years, where he met his wife and finished his 1851 book The War between the United States and Mexico.

== Sheep ranching ==
Kendall was a pioneer in Texas sheep ranching, and is regarded as the father of the industry in Texas. In 1852, Kendall went into the Texas sheep business with three friends. They began with twenty-four Spanish merino rams and an entire flock of churro ewes. Scottish herder Joe Tait was employed to oversee the business located on the Nueces River. By 1853, Kendall moved the flock to his Waco Springs ranch, four miles north of New Braunfels. He then bought a pasture for the sheep in the Boerne vicinity near Post Oak Springs. For the next three years, Kendall's sheep business endured disease, inclement weather and environmental hardships to finally begin showing a profit in 1856. Within two more years, the flock had increased to 3,500. Kendall began marketing his wool clip in Atlanta, Georgia, and began large-scale operations. Kendall submitted regular reports of the business to the New Orleans Picayune, promoting the industry and praising the Texas Hill Country for what he considered its ideal sheep ranching environment. He often contributed articles on the subject to Texas publications. In 1864, he was the first to begin dipping sheep in large vats to eradicate scab disease.

== Personal life and death ==
In 1849 he married French citizen Adeline Suzanne de Valcourt in Paris. The couple had four children. Daughter Georgina deValcourt Kendall Fellowes became trustee of the Kendall family records, which are housed at the University of Texas at Arlington.

George Wilkins Kendall died of pneumonia in the Texas county that bore his name, on October 21, 1867, and is buried at the Boerne Cemetery.

== Bibliography ==
- Kendall, George Wilkins (2010) [First printed in 1845]. Narrative of an Expedition Across the Great Southwestern Prairies, from Texas to Santa Fé. Nabu Press. ISBN 978-1-148-06055-2. OCLC 61972787.
- Kendall, George Wilkins; Nebel, Carl (1851). The War between the United States and Mexico illustrated, : embracing pictorial drawings of all the principal conflicts by C. Nebel ... With a description of each battle, by George Wilkins Kendall. New York. OCLC 77963615.
- Kendall, George Wilkins; Cress, Delbert Lawrence (1999). Dispatches from the Mexican War. University of Oklahoma Press. ISBN 978-0-8061-3121-4. OCLC 651480927.
- Randall L.L.D., Henry Stephens; Kendall, George Wilkins (1865). Sheep Husbandry: With an Account of Different Breeds. Orange Judd. OCLC 310367102.
- Kendall, George Wilkins (1884). Narrative of the Texan Santa Fé Expedition. Wiley & Putnam. OCLC 561051363.
