= Nelson City, Texas =

- Unincorporated community
- Location in Texas and the United States Nelson City (the United States)
- Coordinates: 29°52′39″N 98°47′43″W
- Country: United States
- State: Texas
- County: Kendall
- Elevation: 1,585 ft (483 m)
- Time zone: UTC-6 (Central (CST))
  - Summer (DST): UTC-5 (CDT)
- ZIP codes: 78006
- GNIS feature ID: 1378733

Nelson City is an unincorporated community in Kendall County, Texas, United States. It is located between Boerne and Comfort. While not recorded by the U.S. Census Bureau, it had an estimated population of 50 in 2010. It has never had a post office, and shares ZIP code 78006 with nearby Boerne.

== History ==
The community was established by an area rancher, Edwin Nelson, for whom it is named. Nelson constructed a gas station and dance hall at the location in the late 1920s.
