= Spring Creek Cave =

Cave in Texas, United States

Spring Creek Cave is a cave in Kendall County, near Boerne, Texas, that is not open to the public. It is known for its fossil specimens and a three-mile-long underground river, which sometimes floods out into Spring Creek after heavy rains.
