= Kendall County, Texas =

County in Texas, United States

- County
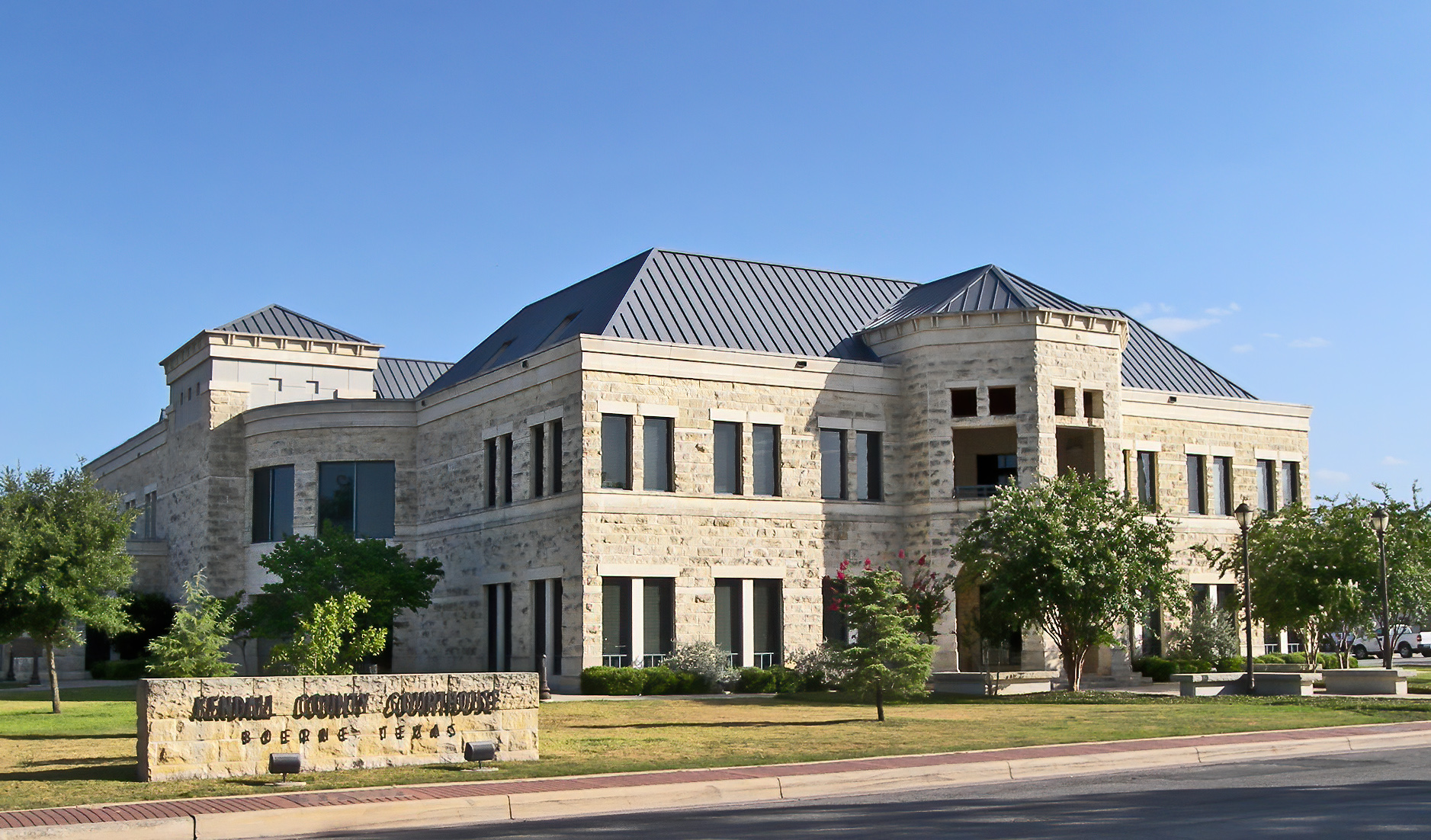
- The Kendall County Courthouse in Boerne

- Seal

- Location within the U.S. state of Texas
- Coordinates: 29°57′N 98°42′W
- Country: United States
- State: Texas
- Founded: 1862
- Named for: George Wilkins Kendall
- Seat: Boerne
- Largest city: Boerne

Area
  - Total: 663 sq mi (1,720 km^{2})
  - Land: 662 sq mi (1,710 km^{2})
  - Water: 0.6 sq mi (1.6 km^{2}) 0.09%

Population (2020)
  - Total: 44,279
  - Estimate (2025): 53,289 ▲
  - Density: 66.9/sq mi (25.8/km^{2})
- Time zone: UTC−6 (Central)
  - Summer (DST): UTC−5 (CDT)
- Congressional district: 21st
- Website: www.kendallcountytx.gov

Kendall County is a county located on the Edwards Plateau in the U.S. state of Texas. In the 2020 census, its population was 44,279. Its county seat is Boerne. The county is named for George Wilkins Kendall, a journalist and Mexican–American War correspondent. Kendall County is located in the Texas German belt region, an area settled by German emigrants in the mid 1800s.

Kendall County is part of the San Antonio–New Braunfels, TX metropolitan statistical area.

Progressive Farmer rated Kendall County fifth in its list of the "Best Places to Live in Rural America" in 2006.

Kendall, along with Hays and Comal Counties, was listed in 2017 of the nation's 10 fastest-growing large counties with a population of at least 10,000. From 2015 to 2016, Kendall County, the second-fastest-growing county in the nation, grew by 5.16%, gaining 2,088 people in a one-year period.

== History ==
=== Before 1850 ===
- Early Native American inhabitants included Kiowa, Comanche, and Lipan Apache.
- In the 1700s, Lipan Apaches discovered Cascade Caverns.
- 1842

April 20 – Adelsverein organized in Germany to promote emigration to Texas.
June 7 – Fisher-Miller Land Grant set aside 3,000,000 acres (1.2×10^{10} m^{2}) to settle 600 families and single men of German, Dutch, Swiss, Danish, Swedish, and Norwegian ancestry in Texas.

- 1844, June 26 – Henry Francis Fisher sold his interest in the land grant to Adelsverein.
- 1845

Prince Carl of Solms-Braunfels secured title to 1,265 acres (5.12 km^{2}) of the Veramendi grant, including the Comal Springs and River, for the Adelsverein.
February – Thousands of German immigrants were stranded at their port of disembarkation, Indianaola on Matagorda Bay. With no food or shelters, living in holes dug into the ground, an estimated 50% died from disease or starvation. The living began to walk to their destinations hundreds of miles away.
May – John O. Meusebach arrived in Galveston.
December 20 – Henry Francis Fisher and Burchard Miller sold their rights in the land grant to Adelsverein.

- 1847

Meusebach–Comanche Treaty
Sisterdale was established.

- 1849 Freethinkers Bettina colonists from Llano County settled Tusculum, named after Cicero's home in ancient Rome. The initial community banned any churches from being erected. The town was later renamed Boerne, for German-Jewish political writer Ludwig Börne, who influenced Karl Marx.

=== 1850–1899 ===
- 1850s George W. Kendall introduced sheep ranching to the county.
- 1854

John O. Meusebach received an appointment as commissioner from Governor Elisha M. Pease.
May 14–15, San Antonio – The Texas State Convention of Germans adopted a political, social, and religious platform, including: 1) Equal pay for equal work; 2) Direct election of the President of the United States; 3) Abolition of capital punishment; 4) "Slavery is an evil, the abolition of which is a requirement of democratic principles.."; 5) Free schools – including universities – supported by the state, without religious influence; and 6) Total separation of church and state.
Comfort is founded by German immigrant Freethinkers and abolitionists.

- 1860 Boerne Village Band was formed by Karl Dienger.
- 1861 Unionists from Kerr, Gillespie, and Kendall Counties participated in the formation of the Union League, a secret organization to support President Abraham Lincoln's policies.
- 1862

Kendall County was established from Kerr and Blanco Counties, named for journalist George Wilkins Kendall. Boerne was made the county seat.
The Union League formed companies to protect the frontier against Indians and their families against local Confederate forces. Conscientious objectors to the military draft were primarily among Tejanos and Germans.
May 30 – Confederate authorities imposed martial law on Central Texas.
August 10 – The Nueces massacre occurred in Kinney County. Jacob Kuechler served as a guide for 61 conscientious objectors attempting to flee to Mexico. Scottish-born Confederate irregular James Duff and his Duff’s Partisan Rangers pursued and overtook them at the Nueces River, 34 were killed, some executed after being taken prisoner. Jacob Kuechler survived the battle. The cruelty shocked the people of Gillespie County; 2,000 took to the hills to escape Duff's reign of terror.
Spring Creek Cemetery near Harper in Gillespie County has a singular grave with the names Sebird Henderson, Hiram Nelson, Gus Tegener, and Frank Scott. The inscription reads "Hanged and thrown in Spring Creek by Col. James Duff's Confederate Regiment".

- 1866 Samuel Boyd Patton was elected chief justice after his home became part of Kendall County which had been Blanco County.
- 1866, August 10 – Treue der Union Monument ("Loyalty to the Union") in Comfort dedicated to the German Texans slain at the Nueces massacre. It is one of only six such sites allowed to fly the United States flag at half-mast in perpetuity.
- 1867 Native Americans kill six sheperds east of Boerne.
- 1870 The original Kendall County limestone courthouse was built (Italianate architecture), with architects Philip Zoeller and J. F. Stendebach.
- 1871 Clinton (age 11) and Jeff Smith (age 9) are kidnapped by a band of Comanches and Lipan Apaches at Cibolo Creek, and are held in captivity by the Natives for five years.
- 1885 Austrian-born Andreas Engel founded Bergheim.

The Sisterdale cotton gin began operations.

- 1887 San Antonio and Aransas Pass Railway began a Boerne-to-San Antonio route.
- 1897, May 27 – John O. Meusebach died at his farm at Loyal Valley in Mason County, and was buried in the Marschall Meusebach Cemetery at Cherry Spring.

=== 1900–present ===
- 1900 Kendall County had 542 farms. Area under cultivation had risen from 153,921 acres (622.90 km^{2}) in 1880 to 339,653 acres (1,374.53 km^{2}). Stockraising was still the principal industry.
- 1905 Citizens of Boerne gathered to share agricultural information, recipes, and news of events. This later became the annual Kendall County Fair.
- 1913 The Kendall County Fair Association was organized and was awarded a nonprofit corporate charter from the State of Texas.
- 1914 Fredericksburg and Northern Railway connected Fredericksburg with the San Antonio and Aransas Pass Railway track just east of Comfort.
- 1918 A hygieostatic bat roost house was built in Comfort to attract bats to eradicate mosquitoes and reduce the spread of malaria. It was designed for former San Antonio Mayor Albert Steves Sr., by bat authority Dr. Charles A. R. Campbell.
- 1930s

The Great Depression brought an increase in tenant farming.
Commercial development of Cascade Caverns began.

- World War II – American military bases in the San Antonio area provided jobs for Kendall County residents.
- 1983 The Guadalupe River State Park opened to the public.
- 1988 The Federal Republic of Germany recognized the Boerne Village Band for its contribution to the German heritage in Texas and America.
- 1990, Earth Day – Cibolo Nature Center opened to the public.
- 1991 The Texas Legislature adopted a resolution recognizing the Boerne Village Band for "keeping alive German music as a part of our heritage."
- 1998 The current Kendall County limestone, steel, and concrete courthouse was built in Boerne, across the street from the original 1870 courthouse with architect Rehler Vaughn & Koone, Inc.
- 2005 Kendall County celebrated its 100th anniversary of the Kendall County Fair. The Kendall County Fair Association continues to produce one of the few remaining entirely privately funded county fairs in Texas.
- 2013 The Kendall County Fair Association, Inc. celebrated its 100th year of existence.
- 2015 Kendall County declared a state of emergency from May flooding.

== Geography ==
According to the U.S. Census Bureau, the county has a total area of 663 square miles (1,720 km^{2}), of which 662 square miles (1,710 km^{2}) are land and 0.6 square miles (1.6 km^{2}) (0.09%) is covered by water.

=== Major highways ===
- Interstate 10
- U.S. Highway 87 (Old Spanish Trail)
- U.S. Highway 87 Business (Main Street)
- U.S. Highway 87 Business (Old Spanish Trail)
- State Highway 27 (Old Spanish Trail)
- State Highway 46
- Farm To Market Road 289 (Old Spanish Trail)
- Farm to Market Road 1621
- Farm to Market Road 3351
- Ranch to Market Road 473
- Ranch to Market Road 474
- Ranch to Market Road 1376
- Ranch to Market Road 3160 (formerly part of FM 3351)

==== Historic highways ====
- Old Spanish Trail (auto trail)
- Glacier to Gulf Highway

=== Adjacent counties ===
- Gillespie County (north)
- Blanco County (northeast)
- Comal County (southeast)
- Bexar County (south)
- Bandera County (southwest)
- Kerr County (west)

=== Waterways ===
- Guadalupe River

=== Caves ===
- Cave Without a Name
- Spring Creek Cave
- Prassell Ranch Cave
- Three Whirlpool Cave
- Cascade Caverns
- Pfeiffer's Water Cave
- Alzafar Water Cave
- Reed Cave

== Demographics ==
Historical population
| Census | Pop. | Note | %± |
|---|---|---|---|
| 1870 | 1,536 | | — |
| 1880 | 2,763 | | 79.9% |
| 1890 | 3,826 | | 38.5% |
| 1900 | 4,103 | | 7.2% |
| 1910 | 4,517 | | 10.1% |
| 1920 | 4,779 | | 5.8% |
| 1930 | 4,970 | | 4.0% |
| 1940 | 5,080 | | 2.2% |
| 1950 | 5,423 | | 6.8% |
| 1960 | 5,889 | | 8.6% |
| 1970 | 6,964 | | 18.3% |
| 1980 | 10,635 | | 52.7% |
| 1990 | 14,589 | | 37.2% |
| 2000 | 23,743 | | 62.7% |
| 2010 | 33,410 | | 40.7% |
| 2020 | 44,279 | | 32.5% |
| 2025 (est.) | 53,289 | ▲ | 20.3% |
U.S. Decennial Census; 1850–2010 2010 2020

=== Racial and ethnic composition ===
Kendall County, Texas – Racial and ethnic composition Note: the US Census treats Hispanic/Latino as an ethnic category. This table excludes Latinos from the racial categories and assigns them to a separate category. Hispanics/Latinos may be of any race.
| Race / Ethnicity (NH = Non-Hispanic) | Pop 1980 | Pop 1990 | Pop 2000 | Pop 2010 | Pop 2020 | % 1980 | % 1990 | % 2000 | % 2010 | % 2020 |
|---|---|---|---|---|---|---|---|---|---|---|
| White alone (NH) | 9,131 | 12,052 | 19,104 | 25,746 | 31,767 | 85.86% | 82.61% | 80.46% | 77.06% | 71.74% |
| Black or African American alone (NH) | 24 | 49 | 63 | 138 | 315 | 0.23% | 0.34% | 0.27% | 0.41% | 0.71% |
| Native American or Alaska Native alone (NH) | 26 | 70 | 79 | 129 | 138 | 0.24% | 0.48% | 0.33% | 0.39% | 0.31% |
| Asian alone (NH) | 20 | 26 | 52 | 202 | 355 | 0.19% | 0.18% | 0.22% | 0.60% | 0.80% |
| Native Hawaiian or Pacific Islander alone (NH) | x | x | 3 | 13 | 36 | x | x | 0.01% | 0.04% | 0.08% |
| Other race alone (NH) | 28 | 0 | 31 | 26 | 202 | 0.26% | 0.00% | 0.13% | 0.08% | 0.46% |
| Mixed race or Multiracial (NH) | x | x | 163 | 327 | 1,437 | x | x | 0.69% | 0.98% | 3.25% |
| Hispanic or Latino (any race) | 1,406 | 2,392 | 4,248 | 6,829 | 10,029 | 13.22% | 16.40% | 17.89% | 20.44% | 22.65% |
| Total | 10,635 | 14,589 | 23,743 | 33,410 | 44,279 | 100.00% | 100.00% | 100.00% | 100.00% | 100.00% |

=== 2020 census ===
As of the 2020 census, the county had a population of 44,279. The median age was 45.1 years. 22.8% of residents were under the age of 18 and 22.3% of residents were 65 years of age or older. For every 100 females there were 94.6 males, and for every 100 females age 18 and over there were 92.4 males age 18 and over.

The racial makeup of the county was 77.8% White, 0.8% Black or African American, 0.7% American Indian and Alaska Native, 0.9% Asian, 0.1% Native Hawaiian and Pacific Islander, 5.7% from some other race, and 14.1% from two or more races. Hispanic or Latino residents of any race comprised 22.6% of the population.

43.2% of residents lived in urban areas, while 56.8% lived in rural areas.

There were 16,406 households in the county, of which 32.4% had children under the age of 18 living in them. Of all households, 62.3% were married-couple households, 12.5% were households with a male householder and no spouse or partner present, and 21.3% were households with a female householder and no spouse or partner present. About 21.6% of all households were made up of individuals and 11.9% had someone living alone who was 65 years of age or older.

There were 18,330 housing units, of which 10.5% were vacant. Among occupied housing units, 75.7% were owner-occupied and 24.3% were renter-occupied. The homeowner vacancy rate was 1.7% and the rental vacancy rate was 8.0%.

=== 2010 census ===
As of the census of 2010, 33,410 people, 8,613 households, and 6,692 families resided in the county. The population density was 36 people per square mile (14 people/km^{2}). The 9,609 housing units averaged 14 units per square mile (5.4/km^{2}). The racial makeup of the county was 92.86% White, 0.56% Native American, 0.35% African American, 0.23% Asian, 4.46% from other races, and 1.55% from two or more races. About 17.89% of the population was Hispanic or Latino of any race.

Of the 8,613 households, 36.30% had children under the age of 18 living with them, 67.20% were married couples living together, 7.90% had a female householder with no husband present, and 22.30% were not families. About 19.20% of all households were made up of individuals, and 8.40% had someone living alone who was 65 years of age or older. The average household size was 2.70 and the average family size was 3.09.

In the county, the population was distributed as 27.20% under the age of 18, 6.10% from 18 to 24, 26.40% from 25 to 44, 26.40% from 45 to 64, and 13.90% who were 65 years of age or older. The median age was 39 years. For every 100 females, there were 95.00 males. For every 100 females age 18 and over, there were 91.40 males.

The median income for a household in the county was $49,521, and for a family was $58,081. Males had a median income of $39,697 versus $28,807 for females. The per capita income for the county was $24,619. About 7.90% of families and 10.50% of the population were below the poverty line, including 13.60% of those under age 18 and 9.40% of those age 65 or over.

== Communities ==
=== Cities ===
- Boerne (county seat)
- Fair Oaks Ranch (partly in Bexar and Comal Counties)

=== Census-designated place ===
- Comfort

=== Other unincorporated communities ===
- Alamo Springs
- Bergheim
- Kendalia
- Kreutzberg
- Lindendale
- Nelson City
- Oberly Crossing
- Pleasant Valley
- Sisterdale
- Waring
- Walnut Grove
- Welfare

=== Ghost towns ===
- Ammans Crossing
- Bankersmith
- Benton
- Block Creek (town)
- Brownsboro
- Currey's Creek
- Hodge's Mill
- Schiller
- Wasp Creek
- Windsor

== Politics ==
Kendall County is an anomaly in Texas politics, being a historically Republican county in a state that at the presidential level was overwhelmingly Democratic until the 1950s. This is largely due to the heavily German American heritage of the county and that the area Kendall County occupies was the center of Texas's small Unionist movement during the Civil War. Most Texas Germans acquiesced to secession, but Fredericksburg and surrounding areas were still self-sufficient and sold surplus food to the army. No Democratic presidential nominee has carried Kendall County since Franklin D. Roosevelt won over 88% of Texas's vote and carried all 254 counties in 1932; his performance is particularly impressive given that, despite the county's long-standing Republican favoritism, he won Kendall County by almost 50 points. In 1936, when Roosevelt won over 87% of Texas's vote, Alf Landon carried the county with over 62% of the vote, making Kendall County the nation's southernmost county to vote for Landon. Since then, only Lyndon Johnson in 1964 and Jimmy Carter in 1976 have managed over 30% for the Democratic Party in Kendall County.

United States presidential election results for Kendall County, Texas
| Year | Republican | | Democratic | | Third party(ies) | |
| Year | No. | % | No. | % | No. | % |
|---|---|---|---|---|---|---|
| 1912 | 119 | 23.56% | 200 | 39.60% | 186 | 36.83% |
| 1916 | 590 | 71.00% | 232 | 27.92% | 9 | 1.08% |
| 1920 | 846 | 72.99% | 142 | 12.25% | 171 | 14.75% |
| 1924 | 689 | 55.93% | 136 | 11.04% | 407 | 33.04% |
| 1928 | 663 | 63.63% | 377 | 36.18% | 2 | 0.19% |
| 1932 | 416 | 25.85% | 1,185 | 73.65% | 8 | 0.50% |
| 1936 | 693 | 62.77% | 405 | 36.68% | 6 | 0.54% |
| 1940 | 1,321 | 75.75% | 421 | 24.14% | 2 | 0.11% |
| 1944 | 1,337 | 75.88% | 309 | 17.54% | 116 | 6.58% |
| 1948 | 1,207 | 67.47% | 511 | 28.56% | 71 | 3.97% |
| 1952 | 1,786 | 82.53% | 370 | 17.10% | 8 | 0.37% |
| 1956 | 1,519 | 81.10% | 341 | 18.21% | 13 | 0.69% |
| 1960 | 1,544 | 73.52% | 549 | 26.14% | 7 | 0.33% |
| 1964 | 1,200 | 55.22% | 970 | 44.64% | 3 | 0.14% |
| 1968 | 1,569 | 63.50% | 538 | 21.77% | 364 | 14.73% |
| 1972 | 2,681 | 84.23% | 484 | 15.21% | 18 | 0.57% |
| 1976 | 2,543 | 67.04% | 1,190 | 31.37% | 60 | 1.58% |
| 1980 | 3,890 | 76.48% | 1,075 | 21.14% | 121 | 2.38% |
| 1984 | 4,568 | 82.72% | 938 | 16.99% | 16 | 0.29% |
| 1988 | 4,875 | 76.20% | 1,446 | 22.60% | 77 | 1.20% |
| 1992 | 4,162 | 56.60% | 1,374 | 18.68% | 1,818 | 24.72% |
| 1996 | 5,940 | 67.65% | 2,092 | 23.82% | 749 | 8.53% |
| 2000 | 8,788 | 79.36% | 1,901 | 17.17% | 384 | 3.47% |
| 2004 | 11,434 | 81.25% | 2,532 | 17.99% | 106 | 0.75% |
| 2008 | 12,971 | 77.46% | 3,599 | 21.49% | 176 | 1.05% |
| 2012 | 14,508 | 81.58% | 3,043 | 17.11% | 232 | 1.30% |
| 2016 | 15,700 | 77.40% | 3,643 | 17.96% | 940 | 4.63% |
| 2020 | 20,083 | 75.74% | 6,020 | 22.70% | 413 | 1.56% |
| 2024 | 22,668 | 77.33% | 6,355 | 21.68% | 292 | 1.00% |

United States Senate election results for Kendall County, Texas1
| Year | Republican | | Democratic | | Third party(ies) | |
| Year | No. | % | No. | % | No. | % |
|---|---|---|---|---|---|---|
| 2024 | 22,068 | 75.37% | 6,666 | 22.77% | 546 | 1.86% |

United States Senate election results for Kendall County, Texas2
| Year | Republican | | Democratic | | Third party(ies) | |
| Year | No. | % | No. | % | No. | % |
|---|---|---|---|---|---|---|
| 2020 | 20,584 | 77.99% | 5,335 | 20.21% | 473 | 1.79% |

Texas Gubernatorial election results for Kendall County
| Year | Republican | | Democratic | | Third party(ies) | |
| Year | No. | % | No. | % | No. | % |
|---|---|---|---|---|---|---|
| 2022 | 17,719 | 78.55% | 4,506 | 19.98% | 332 | 1.47% |

The county is part of the 21st District in the United States House of Representatives, represented by Republican Chip Roy, the 25th district of the Texas State Senate, represented by Republican Donna Campbell, and the 19th District of the Texas House of Representatives and is represented by Republican Ellen Troxclair.

== Education ==
School districts include:

- Blanco Independent School District
- Boerne Independent School District
- Comal Independent School District
- Comfort Independent School District
- Fredericksburg Independent School District

All of the county is in the service area of Alamo Community College District.

== Government offices ==
=== State parks ===
- Boerne-Hallie Maude Neff State Park (former)
- Guadalupe River State Park (part)
- Old Tunnel State Park

=== Fire departments ===
- Alamo Springs Volunteer Fire Department
- Berghiem Volunteer Fire Department
- Boerne Fire Department
- Comfort Fire Department
- kendalia Volunteer Fire Department
- Sisterdale Volunteer Fire Department
- Waring Volunteer Fire Department

==== Post offices ====
- Village Post Office, Bergheim
- Boerne Carrier Annex
- Boerne Post Office
- Comfort Post Office
- Kendalia Post Office
- Waring Post Office

==== Former ====
- Welfare Post Office (1880–1976)
- Currey's Creek Post Office (1870–1894)
- Panther Creek Post Office (June 1879–August 1879)
- Ammans Post Office (February 1881–October 1881)
- Benton Post Office (1875–1880)
- Block Creek Post Office (1884–1895)
- Curry Post Office (1894–1895)
- Guadalupe Post Office (1875–1890)
- Hastings Post Office (1890–1903)
- Hodge's Mill Post Office (1867–1870)
- Joseway Post Office (February 1880–March 1880)
- Schiller Post Office (1890–1907)
- South Grape Creek Post Office (1875–1881)
- Waringford Post Office (1888–1891)
- Windsor Post Office (1880–1888)
- Bankersmith Post Office
- Brownsboro Post Office

== Darmstadt Society of Forty ==
Count Castell of the Adelsverein negotiated with the separate Darmstadt Society of Forty to colonize two hundred families on the Fisher–Miller Land Grant territory in Texas. In return, they were to receive $12,000 in money, livestock, equipment and provisions for a year. After the first year, the colonies were expected to support themselves. The colonies attempted were Castell, Leiningen, Bettina, Schoenburg and Meerholz in Llano County; Darmstädler Farm in Comal County; and Tusculum in Kendall County. Of these, only Castell survives. The colonies failed after the Adelsverein funding expired, and also due to conflict of structure and authorities. Some members moved to other Adelsverein settlements in Texas. Others moved elsewhere, or returned to Germany.

== See also ==
- German Texan
- Kendall County Courthouse and Jail
- List of museums in Central Texas
- National Register of Historic Places listings in Kendall County, Texas
- Recorded Texas Historic Landmarks in Kendall County
