= Currey's Creek, Texas =

Coordinates: 29.9700°N 98.5889°W

Curry's Creek was a settlement that ran for five miles along Curry Creek, west and south of Kendalia in Kendall County, Texas, United States. The settlement was founded in 1850. In the 1850s, Currey's Creek had a population of 100 or more. Judge Samuel B. Patton moved to Currey's Creek in 1847, when the area was still in Blanco County.
