= Cascade Caverns =

Limestone cave in Kendall County, Texas, US

Coordinates: 29.764°N 98.681°W

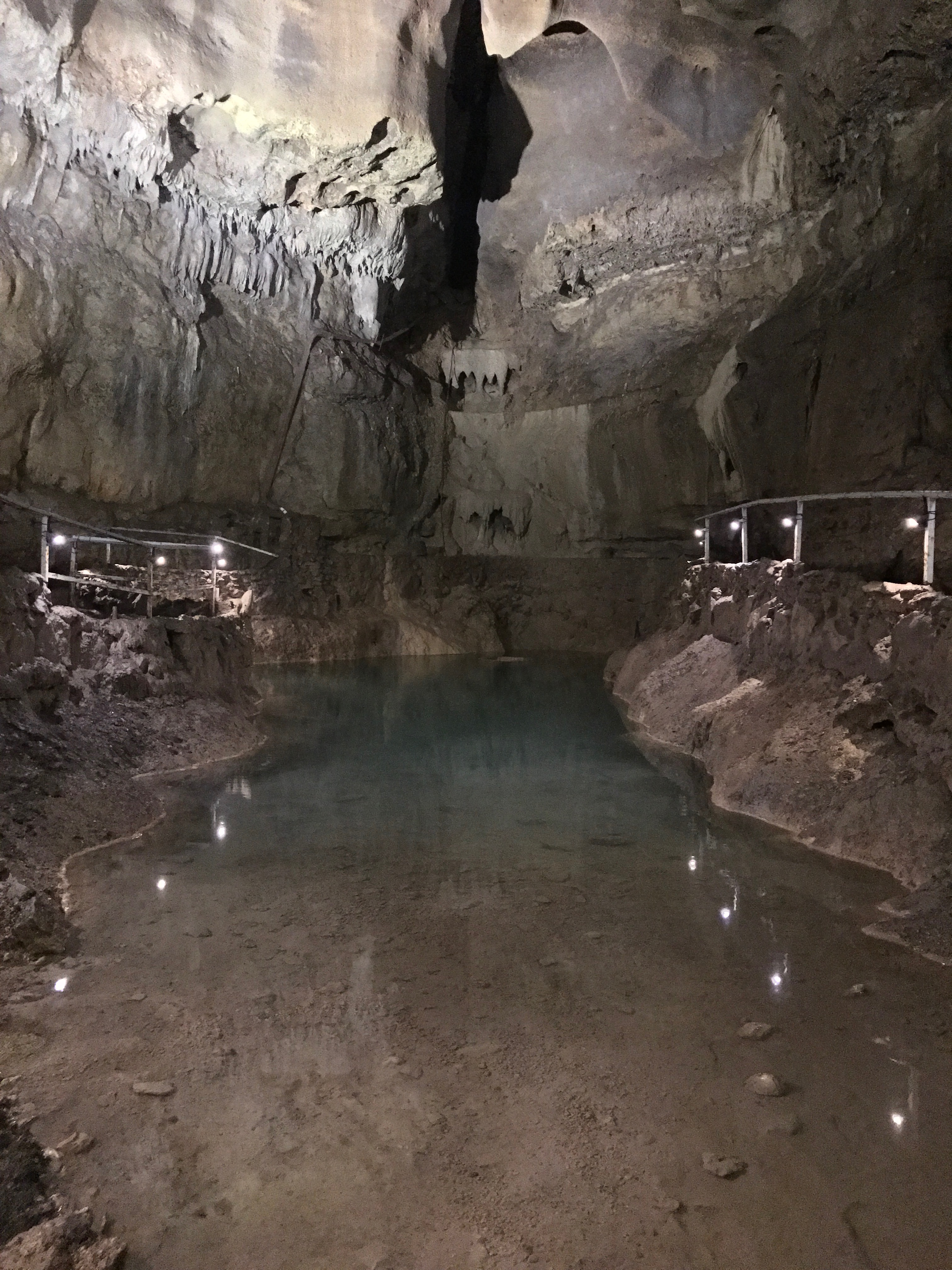
- Cascade Caverns Cathedral Room
- Interactive map of Cascade Caverns
- Location: Kendall County, Texas, United States
- Depth: 132 Feet at Cathedral Room
- Length: 1/2 mile
- Discovery: Pre-1800
- Geology: Limestone
- Difficulty: Beginner/Easy
- Hazards: None
- Access: Show cave
- Show cave opened: 1932
- Website: http://www.cascadecaverns.com/

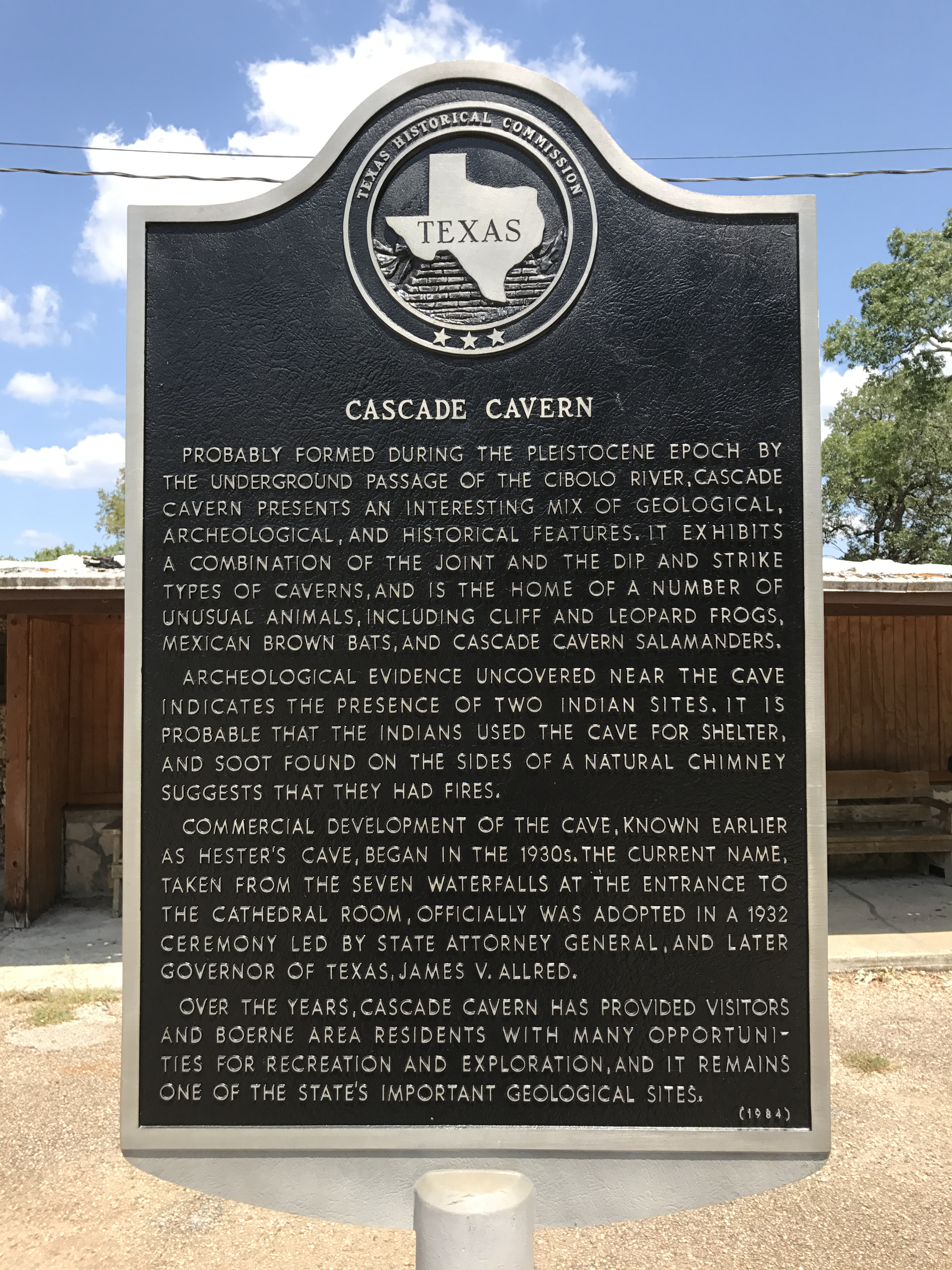
Texas Historical Marker for Cascade Caverns

Cascade Caverns is a historically, geologically, and biologically important limestone solutional cave 3 mi (4.8 km) south of Boerne, Texas, United States, on 226 Cascade Caverns Road, in Kendall County. It has been commercially operated as a show cave and open for public tours since 1932. Informal tours were run as far back as 1875, when Dr. Benjamin Hester owned the cave property. The cave was known by the native Lipan Apache people who lived in the area prior to 1800.

== History ==
Cascade Caverns is part of the Glen Rose Formation, a shallow marine to shoreline geological formation from the Lower Cretaceous period. This formation has been exposed in a large area beginning in South-central Texas, running north through the Texas Hill Country, ending up in North-central Texas.

The cave has been open to the environment for many tens of thousands of years, as evidenced by prehistoric animal finds and Lipan Apache artifacts from the 1700s. In the mid-19th century, various legends existed about a hermit who lived on the ledge at the entrance to the cave. In 1878, August Siemering, one of the co-founders of the San Antonio Express News, wrote the book Ein Verfehltes Leben (A Stolen Life, or A Wasted Life) about a hermit who lived in the cave. The book was later translated into English in 1932, The Hermit of the Cavern by May E. Francis, a University of Texas professor.

A cave in the area was also mentioned in the book The Boy Captives by Clinton L. Smith about two local boys who were abducted by Comanche and Lipan Indians on February 26, 1871. They spent several years living with the Indians until they were finally returned to their family. The cave may be Cascade Caverns or any of the other caves in the Cibolo Creek area.

The cave was first commercially opened in 1932 and operated until about 1941. Alfred and Edith Gray were the original landowners when the cave was first opened. The cave was closed during WWII because most of the men were away fighting in Europe and strict gas rationing limited travel. During the time of closure, the cave's artifact collection was looted from the gift shop. Business was resumed in the late 1940s. Cascade Caverns had been originally known as Hester's Cave, named after a late 19th-century landowner. It became most famous as a result of Frank Nicholson's publication of cave explorations.

Frank Nicholson (formerly of Carlsbad Caverns) was the first person in modern times to explore the cave all the way to the Cathedral Room. Several other people helped to explore the main cave along with other caves in the area, including Bernard Cartwright and his brother Dan. Bernard was married to Mary Rose (née Kronkosky), who said that Edith Gray and she and their children would worry and wait for the cave explorers to come back out into the light of day.

The exploration in 1931 required getting past the Lake Room which was a sump. According to a newspaper article from November 1931 in the San Antonio Express News, they had some waterproof molasses buckets that they put their lights in. Also, a legend holds that they put flashlights in mason jars.

The cave tour business changed hands many times over the years. In the 1930s, a flag-stop on the San Antonio-Boerne SA&AP train line ran by the cave about 100 yards (91 m) from the entrance. The current gift shop was originally a dance hall next to a kitchen. The Menger Hotel ran a restaurant near the cave entrance when the cave initially opened as a commercial endeavor in 1932. At one time, a toy train from Joske's department store ran around the grounds. The train still exists and is in storage but is no longer used. At one time, a swimming pool, a movie theater, and a gravity house were nearby.

In 1967, artist Paul "P.B." Kime, who had a studio at Cascade Caverns in the 1960s, created a parade float that was used in the first Boerne Berges Fest in 1967 and the first Weihnacht's Parade in 1987.

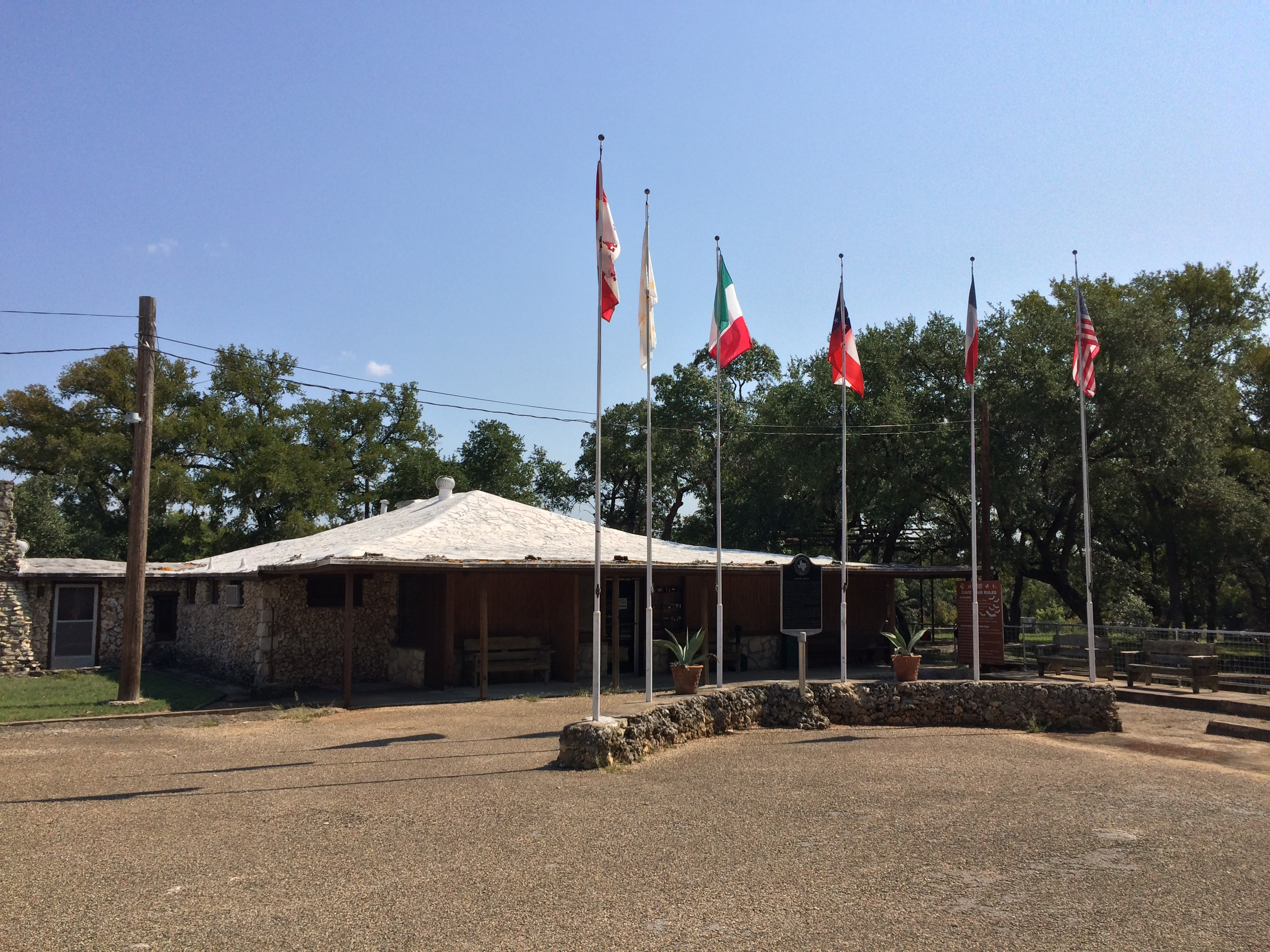
The original Cascade Caverns gift shop was built in the 1930s. It served as the gift shop for decades until 2002, when a catastrophic flood badly damaged the building.

In April 1984, a Texas historical marker was placed near the cave to commemorate the natural landmark.

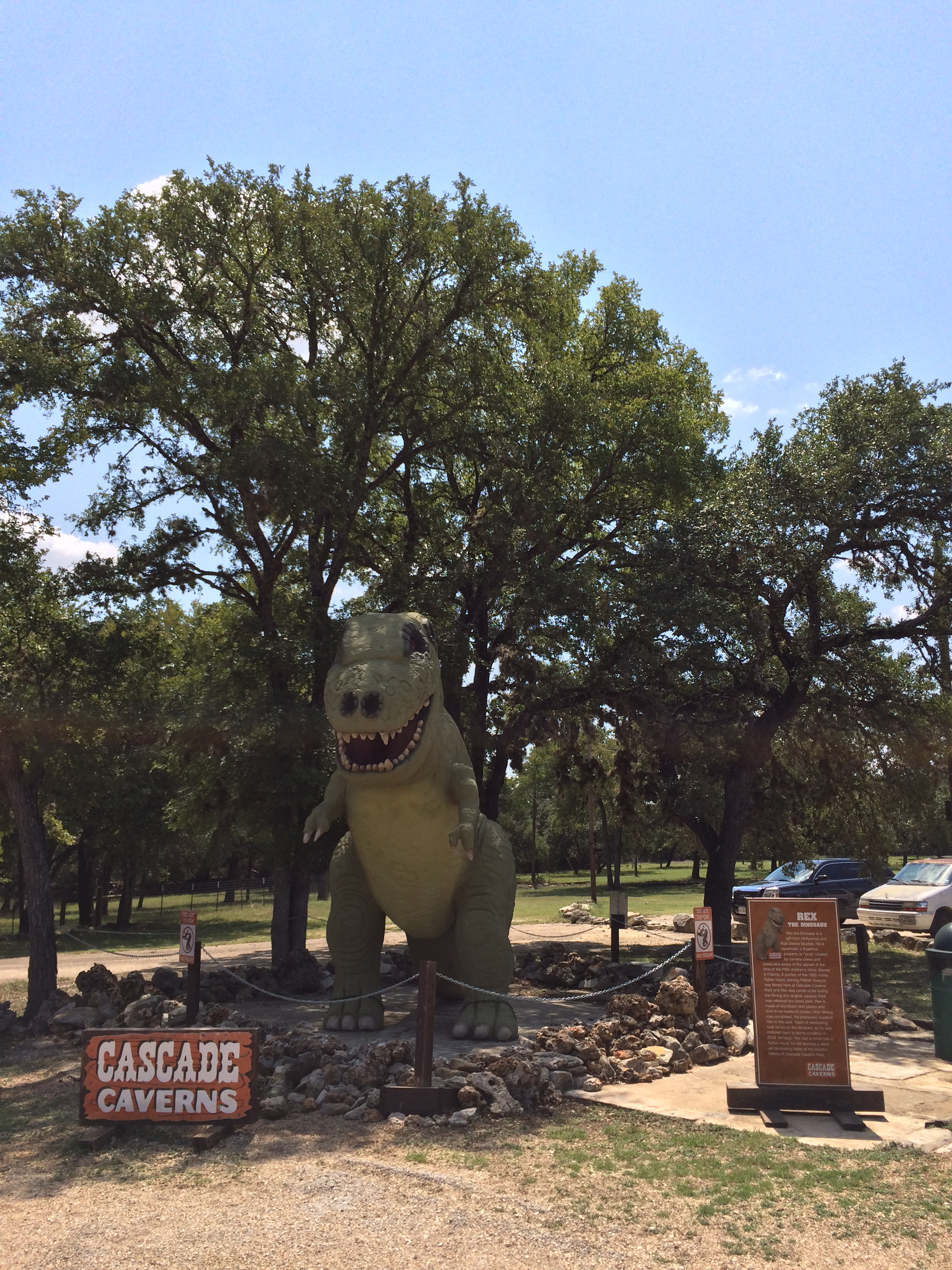
Rex was created as a movie prop for the 1993 movie Father Hood starring Patrick Swayze. The Disney Company filmed for several weeks inside the cave and on the grounds outside.

In 1993, the Walt Disney Company filmed a movie called Father Hood starring Patrick Swayze. They filmed for several weeks both inside the cave and out on the grounds. Several minutes of footage were used in the final version of the film. A prop in the film was a giant T. rex, which is still located near the gift shop today.

The original gift shop (constructed in 1932) was badly damaged, and the Alfred and Edith Gray Theater (constructed in 1984) was destroyed, in a flood in 2002.

In 2005, Cascade Caverns was the scene of a murder when Dario Acevedo, a worker at the park, shot and killed fellow worker Jeffrey Donofrio. Acevedo was sentenced to life in prison.

== Description ==
Cascade Caverns maintains a temperature range of 60–65 °F (16–18 °C) all year round. A 45- to 60-minute commercial tour passes through 0.5 miles (0.80 km) of flowstone corridors and winding chambers, which leads 132 feet (40 m) below the surface and into the Cathedral Room.

Below the Cathedral Room is another cave that is only accessible through a drainpipe that was installed in the early 1960s after the natural passage collapsed during a flood. Adventure Tours to the lower cave are given by expert cavers by reservation only. The sump at the bottom of the Lower Cave is about 230 feet (70 m) below the surface.

The cave was host to Texas' only cavern with a natural interior waterfall. Originally, seven waterfalls were in the cavern. The 1950s Texas drought caused all of the waterfalls to dry up, except for the one in the Cathedral Room. It would either not run or unexpectedly flood the room, so in the 1960s, the original source of the water was sealed up and an artificial waterfall was installed to mimic the original one without the danger of flooding. This very feature, the cascading waterfall, had earned the cave its name. The cave is 95% alive and water droplets persistently fall upon the cave formations. The primary formations found in the cave are soda straws. Most are quite short because of frequent flooding.

The cave is home to unusual insects, including cave crickets (Rhaphidophoridae) and cave beetles (Rhadine persephone). Also to be found in the cave are microscopic creatures called Stygobromus dejectus, the Cascade Caverns amphipod. Also, amphibians, crawfish, reptiles, tricolored bats (Pipistrellus), and the rare Cascade Caverns neotenic salamanders live in the cave. Known as the Cascade Caverns salamander or Kendall County salamander, it can only be found in Cascade Caverns and another regional cave, the Cave Without a Name.

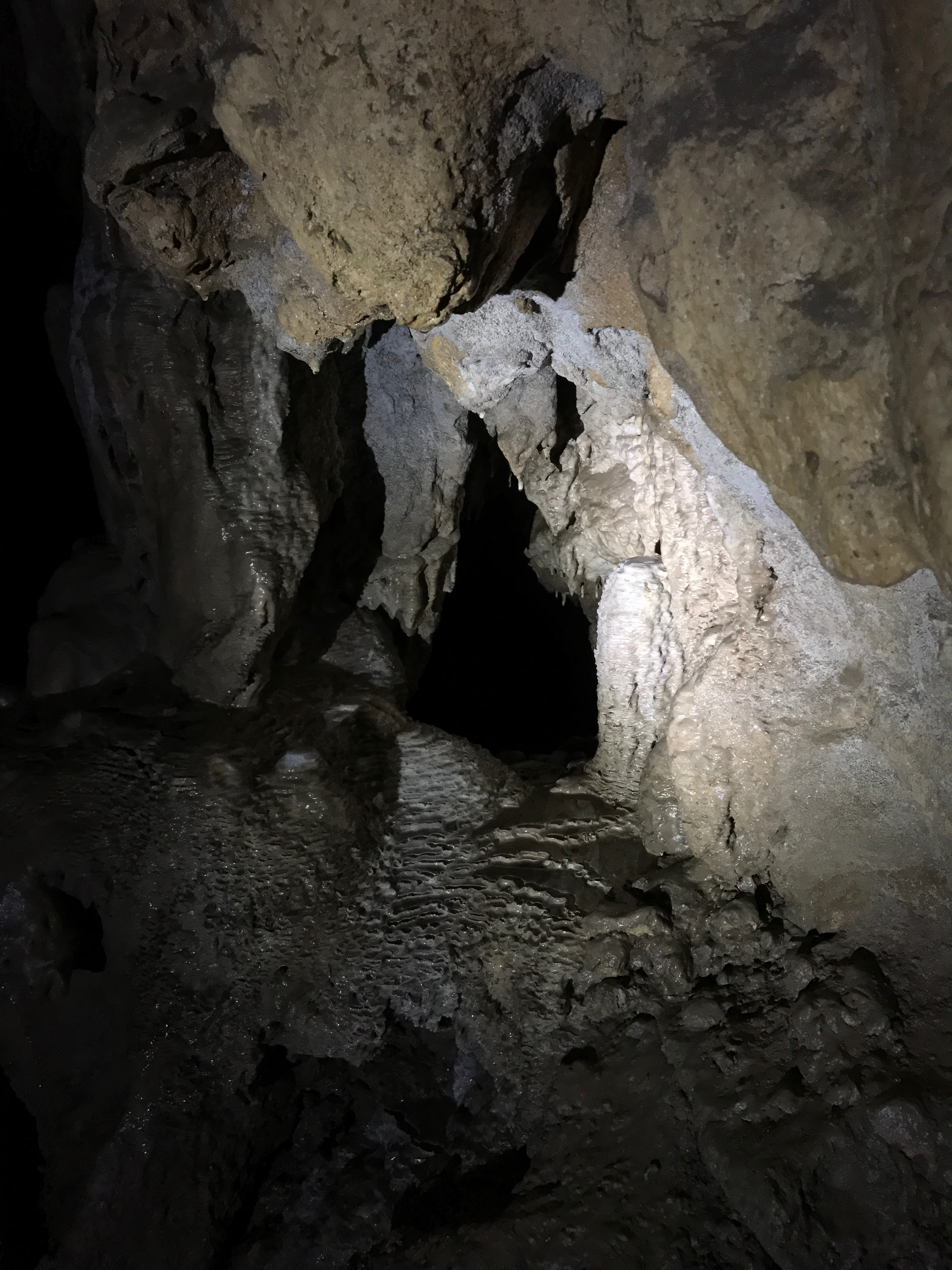
A hole in the cave, Pase de la Muerte, marked on the map in the gift shop as the Passage of Death

Mastodon remains, saber-toothed cat bones (Smilodon), American bison bones, and other animal parts have been found in the cave. Native American artifacts, human remains, and even a pistol were reportedly found during excavation of the front room. Most of these items disappeared during the closure in the early 1940s.

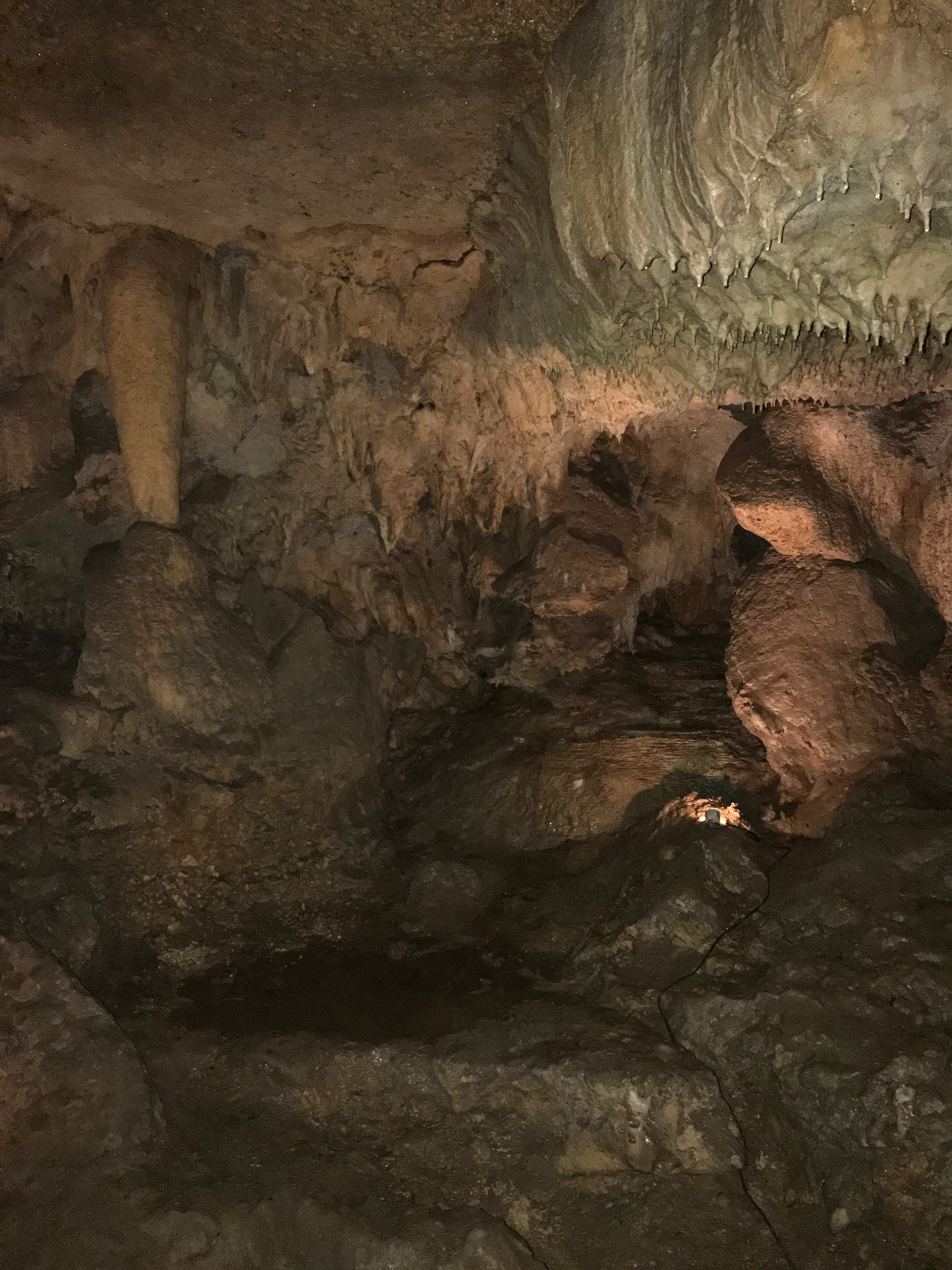
A small grotto between the Imagination Room and Storm Canyon

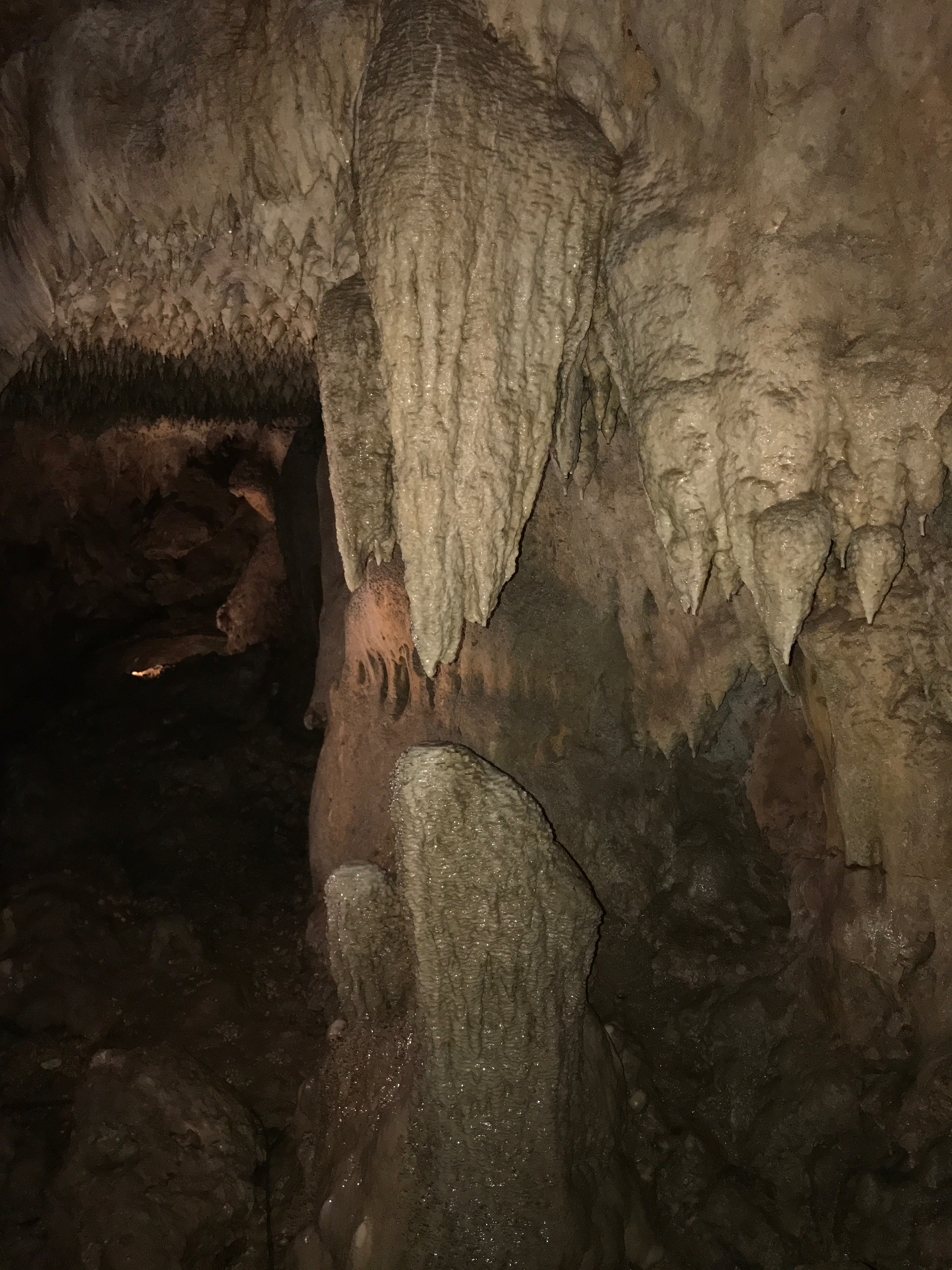
The Twin Sisters formation, a stalactite and stalagmite pair located just above Storm Canyon

Tours are run year-round, with only rare closings due to flooding. A dam protects the cave from unexpected flash flooding. Quite a few floods have happened throughout the years that have affected the cave. Naturally, the cave formed with the help of flooding, with water helping to carve out the rock. During the exploration in 1931, white fish were reported to be in the cave. After the natural flow of water was inhibited with the dam, these fish are no longer seen.

== Flooding at Cascade Caverns ==
Year	Month	Day(s)	Inches	Notes
1900	September	9-10	12.36"	1900 Galveston hurricane
1913	October	1	16.37"	El Nino
1919	September	15	13.90"	Hurricane
1921	September	7-11	39.70"	September 1921 San Antonio floods (51 San Antonio deaths)
1932	July	1-2	32.4-35.6"	Guadalupe River Basin Flood
1935	June	9-15	12.59"	The "Great Flood"
1937	May	31	5.94"	Destroyed Cascade Dam
1946	September	26	9.45"	6 San Antonio deaths
1952	September	9-11	13.63"	Central Texas Flood
1965	May	18	10.26"	Unnamed flood
1972	May	11-12	31.65"-38"	New Braunfels-Seguin Flood
1978	August	1-4	23.5"-46.62"	"500 Year Flood" (20+ deaths in Bandera/Kendall/Kerr Counties)
1987	July	16-17	11.0"	Comfort Bus Tragedy Flood (10 student deaths)
1992	May	16-17	12.61"	The "50 Year Flood"
1997	June	21-22	16.56"	El Nino
1998	August	22-25	15.85"	Tropical Storm Charley (1998)
1998	October	16-18	22.0"	Hurricane Madeline (1998)
2002	July	1-7	28.43"	Damaged the Old Gift Shop and destroyed the Movie Theater
2007	May	1-2	10.31"	Tom Summers drowns at Cave Without a Name
2015	May	23-24	17.33"	Texas-Oklahoma Flood (El Nino related)
2015	October	24-30	9.22"	Hurricane Patricia

== Photo gallery ==
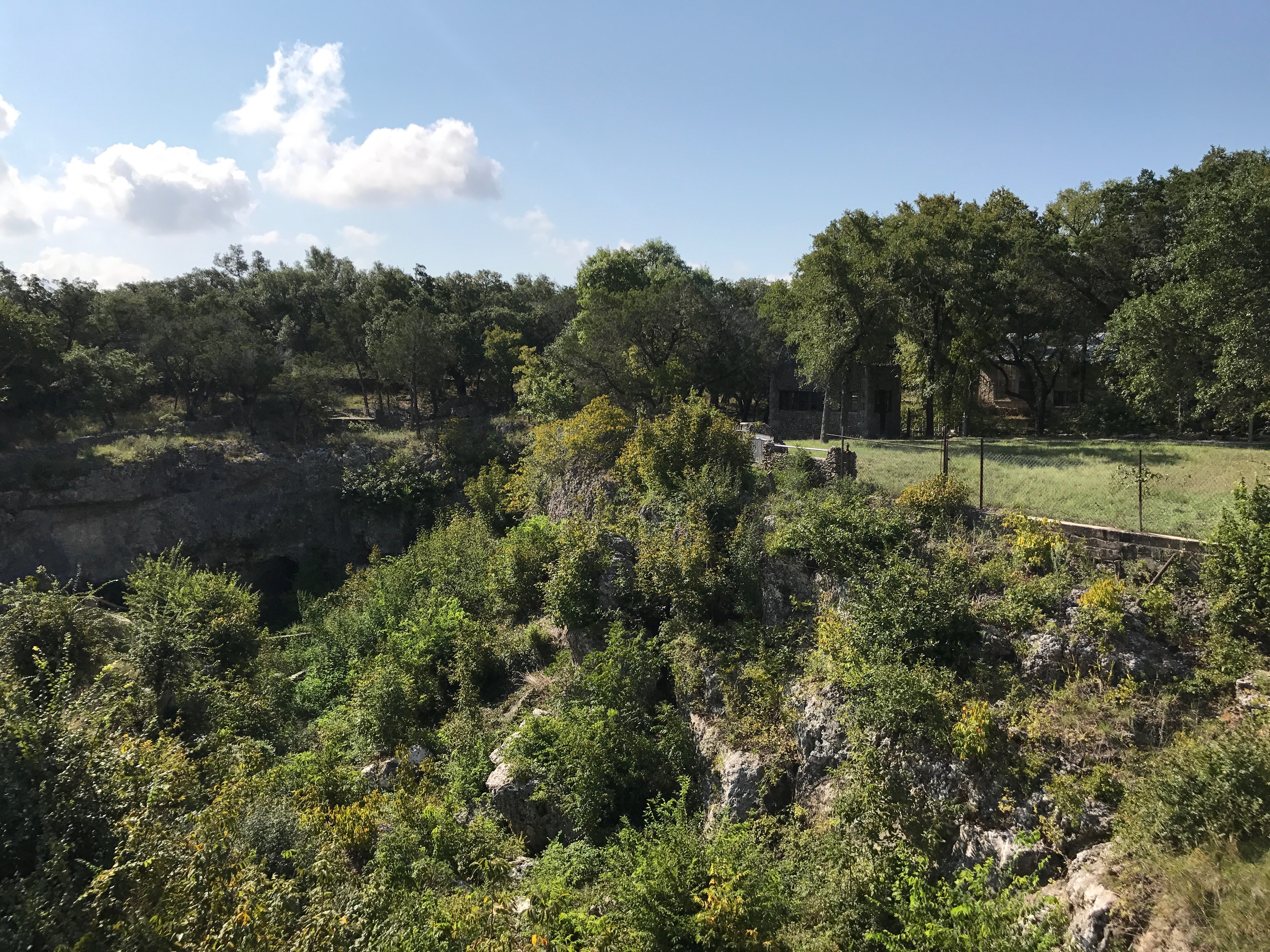
View from Cascade Caverns Dam

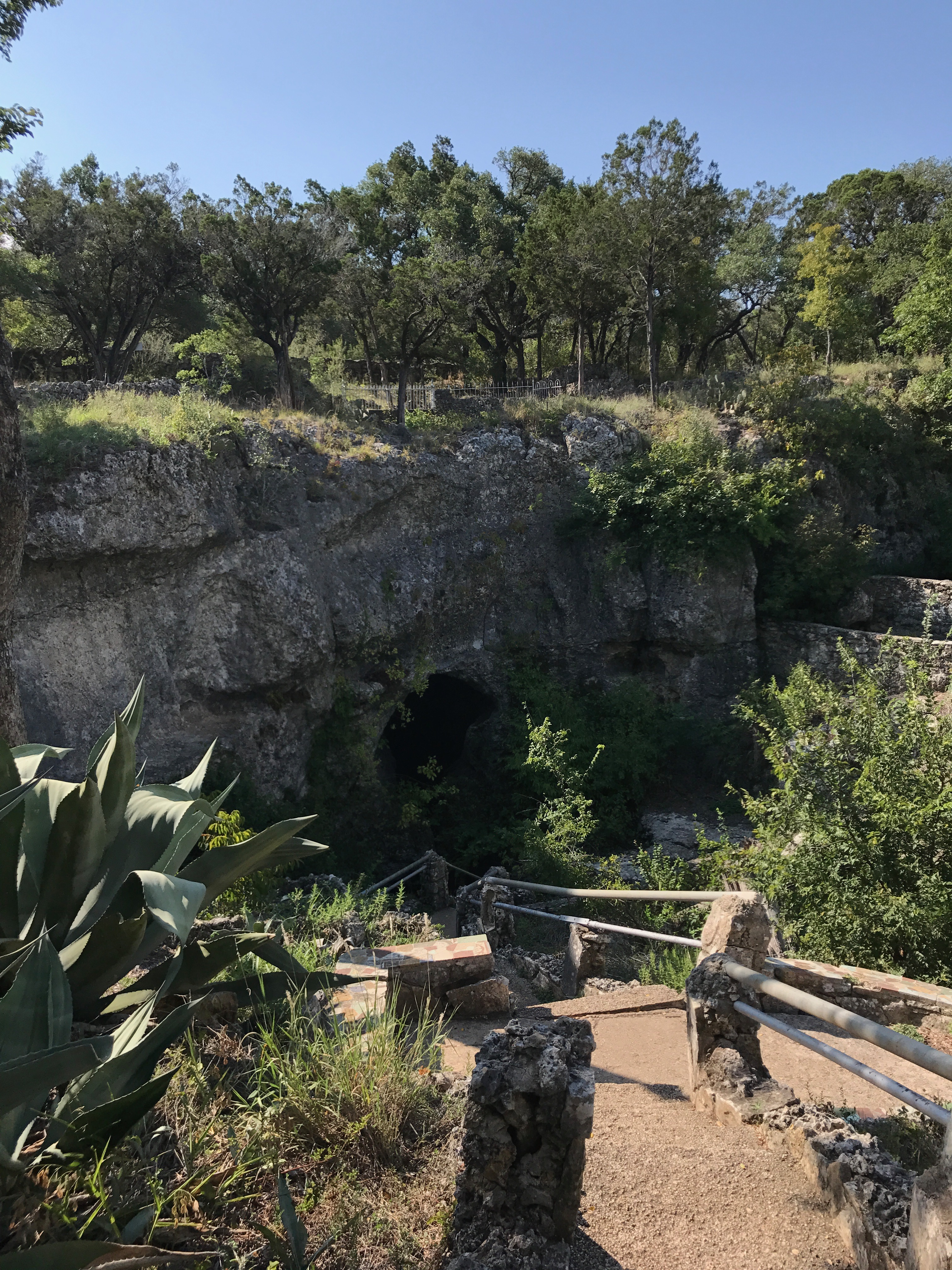
Cave mouth at Cascade Caverns

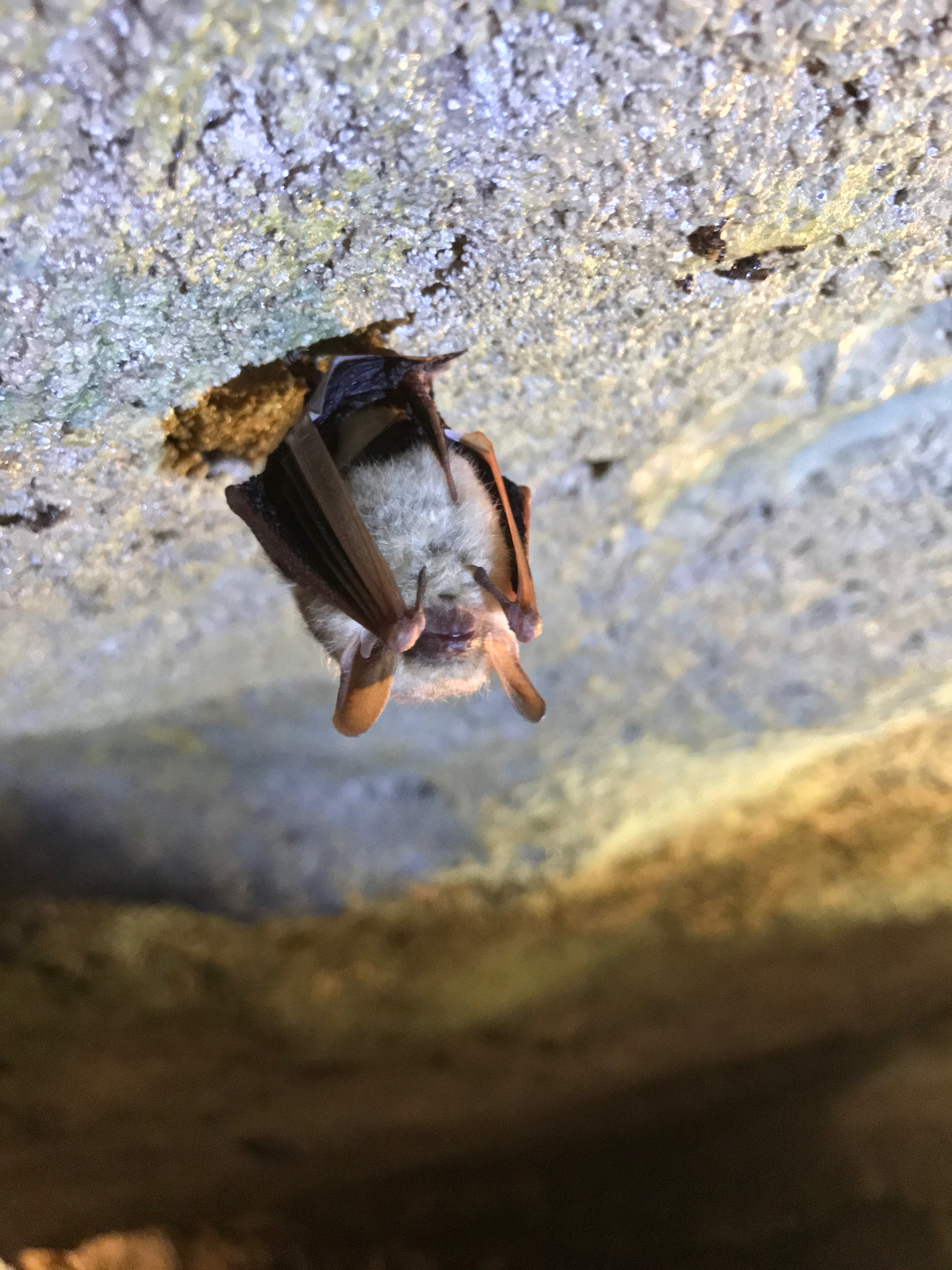
Cascade Caverns tricolor (Pipistrellus) bat

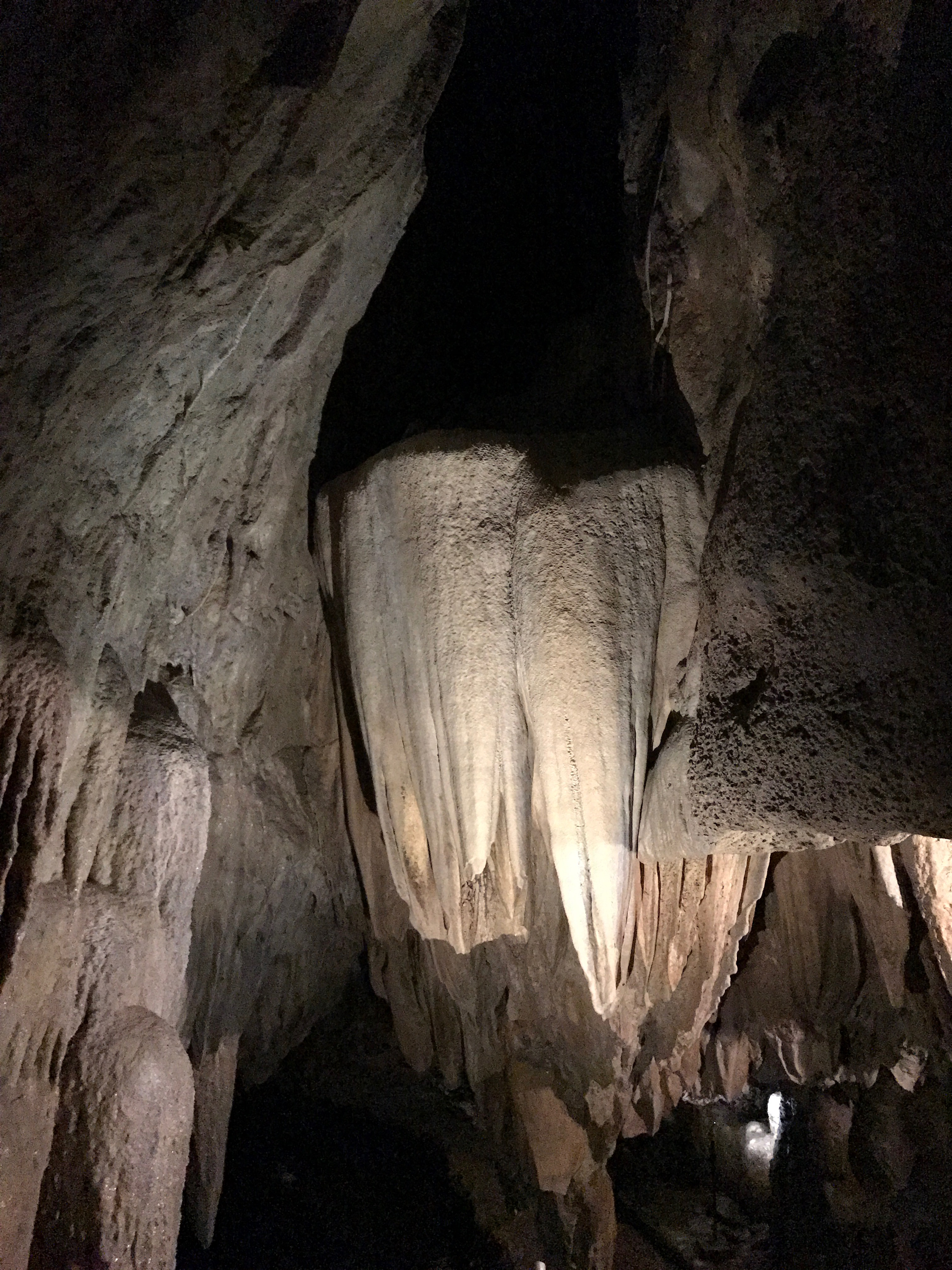
The Giant Molar - a cross between a stalactite and a shield formation

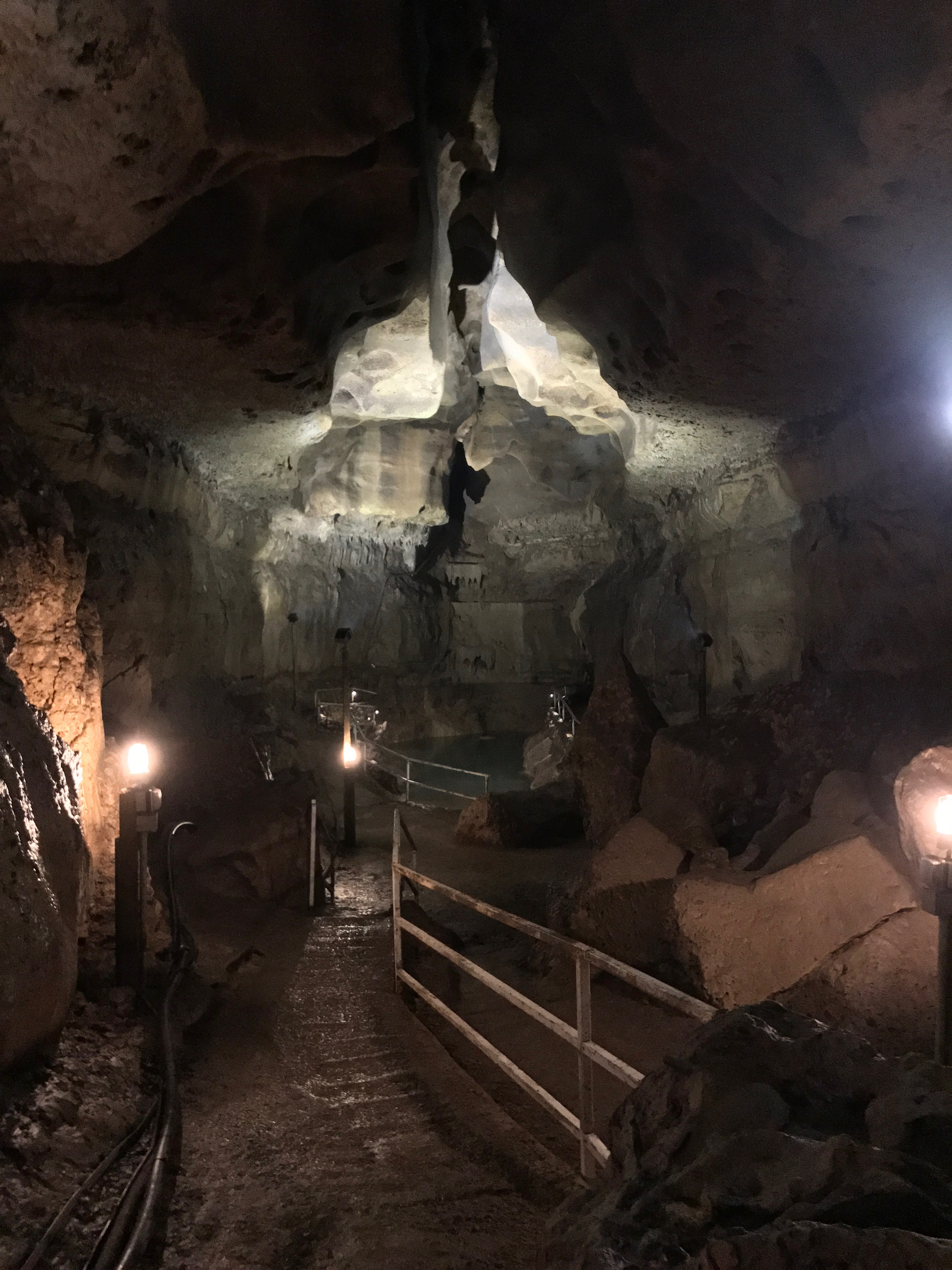
View from Storm Canyon of the Cathedral Room
