= Cave Without a Name =

Limestone cave in the Texas Hill Country

Coordinates: 29°53′10″N 98°37′00″W

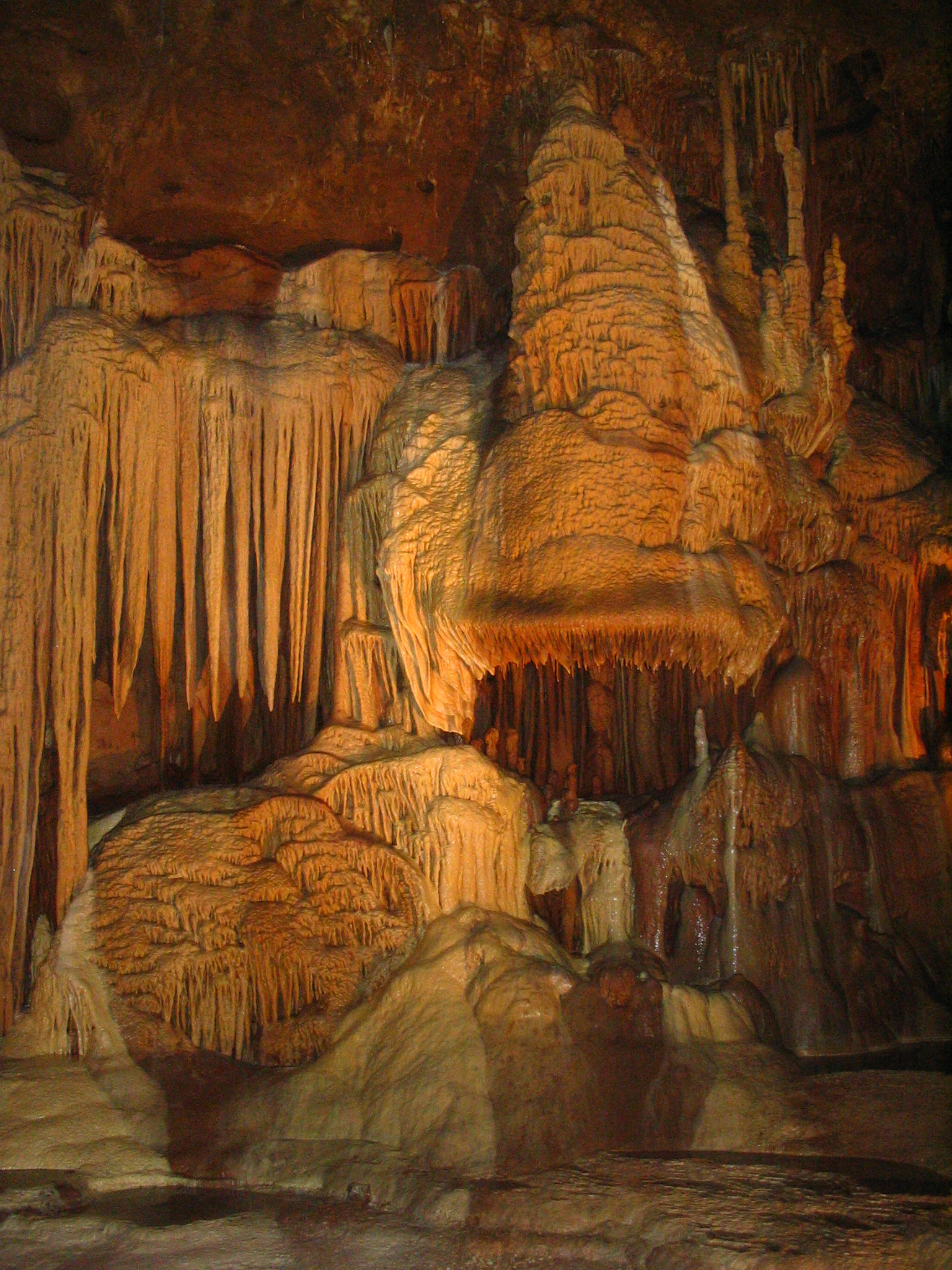
- Interactive map of Cave Without a Name
- Location: Kendall County, near Boerne, Texas
- Geology: Limestone
- Access: Show cave

U.S. National Natural Landmark
- Designated: 2009

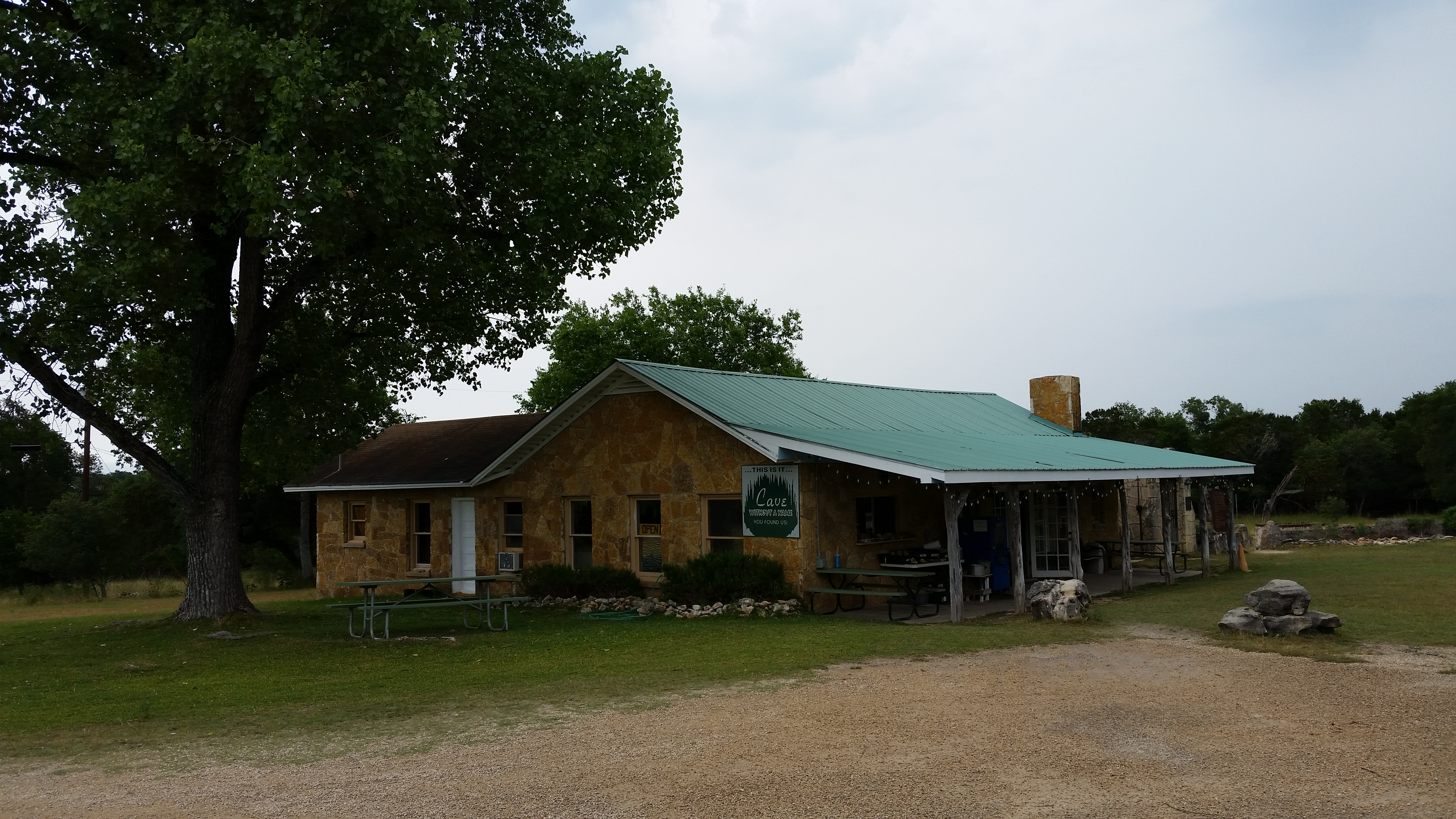
Cave Without a Name Gift Shop and former home

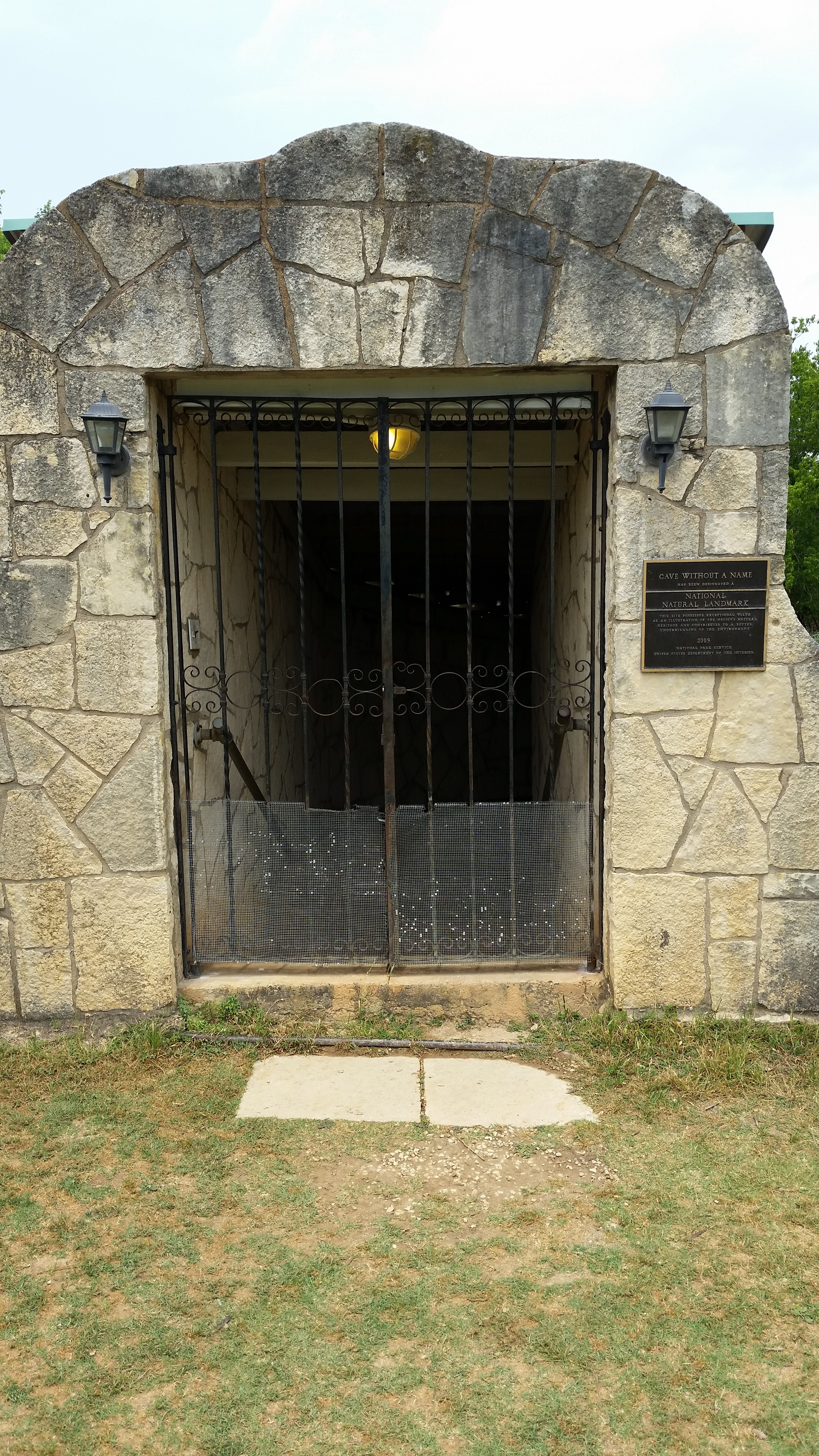
Cave Without a Name entrance with National Natural Landmark marker

The Cave Without a Name is a limestone solutional cave in the Texas Hill Country region of Central Texas. It is a National Natural Landmark.

The cave is located 40 mi (64 km) from downtown San Antonio, and 10 miles northeast of Boerne off FM 474 and Kreutzberg Road. It has been commercially operated as a show cave and open for public tours since 1939. It is a member of the National Cave Association.

== History ==
Although the cave has been open to the environment for many tens of thousands of years, as evidenced by numerous prehistoric animal finds discovered there, known human contact with the cave began only in the early 20th century, when a small ranch animal became trapped in the small external opening of the cave, known as a sinkhole. The cave went largely unnoticed again until the 1920s during the era of Prohibition, when a small moonshine distillery was installed in the uppermost cavern. It again fell into obscurity until three local children went exploring beyond the location of the abandoned still the sinkhole in 1935. These children are believed to be the first who entered the main chambers of the cave.

After the discovery, Jim Horn from San Antonio purchased the property to open it as a commercial venture. The show cave received its name after its official opening in 1939, as verified by a newspaper article that hangs in the cave's gift shop, in a state-wide contest held in 1940. A young boy suggested that the cave "was too beautiful to have a name", so he received the $50 cash prize award. The second owner of the Cave Without a Name, Eugene Ebell, renamed the cave "Century Caverns" in the late 1950s, but after several years of grief from the locals, Mr. Ebell changed the name back to Cave Without a Name.

Cave Without a Name was declared a National Natural Landmark by the National Park Service in February 2009.

== Description ==
Built in 1939, the stairwell into the cave has 126 steps descending to about 80 ft (24 m) below the surface. The cave maintains a constant temperature of 66 °F (19 °C). Within the cave are two main areas. The main set of chambers open to the public make up the show cave, extending just over a quarter of a mile. This part of the cave consists of six large, well-lit rooms full of speleothems, including stalactites, stalagmites, helictites, columns, and draperies. The second main area of the cave is an extensive set of caverns linked to the underground extension of the Guadalupe River. During a 1975 expedition of the Cave Without a Name, cavers mapped out over 2.7 mi (4.3 km) of caverns, making it the seventh-longest cave in Texas.

Due to the great natural acoustics created by three large solution domes on the ceiling of the Throne Room, the cave is host to 12 concerts yearly with a maximum attendance of 200 people. The music events vary from classical musicians, folk, Broadway, opera, and seasonal vocal groups. Unique features of the cave include the 50 ft-long (15 m) set of rimstone dams beneath the natural spring-fed pool, a 19 ft-long (5.8 m) special specimen of cave drapery our "Texas-sized cave bacon" thought to be the longest in Texas, stalagmites that resemble the nativity scene, and a large leaning column known as the Leaning Tower of Boerne. In the winter months, the cave becomes home for the solitary Tricolored bat. These seasonal inhabitants do not interfere with the tours as they only use the cave for hibernation. Another resident of the cave is a rare blind Texas salamander known as the Kendall County salamander that may only be found in the Cave Without a Name and another area cave, Cascade Caverns.

In addition to cave tours, guests to Cave Without a Name as of 2022 may enjoy hiking trails, gem panning, use of picnic tables, and RV and tent camping. Some activities require an additional fee. The gift shop features a large selection of rocks, stones, and fossils for sale, including numerous amethyst cathedrals, jewelry, and more. Guests can choose from several sizes of uncut geodes and have them sliced open in the large geode saw onsite.

== Accident ==
On April 30, 2007, Thomas Summers, III, died in a nearby, connected cave known as Dead Man's Cave. Thomas Summers was the manager of Cave Without a Name and the son of the third and current owner of the cave, Thomas Summers, II. Another park employee, Brent Holbert, and Summers had gone into Dead Man's Cave to investigate why water from recent rains was not draining from Cave Without a Name. They swam into Dead Man's Cave, where at times only two inches of breathing room remained. The two separated when Holbert decided not to go any further because of the danger, and told Summers "let's get the hell out of here". Summers chose to go a few yards further, and after receiving no response from several shouts, Holbert exited the cave to call for help. Thomas Summers's body was recovered by cavers experienced in cave diving a few hours later.
