= Lindendale, Texas =

Unincorporated community in Texas, US

Coordinates: 30°06′43″N 98°37′55″W

Lindendale is an unincorporated community in Kendall County, Texas, United States, on Ranch to Market Road 1888.

The community was first settled in the 1860s. The community was originally Mountain Glen, but the name was changed for unknown reasons. The Handbook of Texas states that the community was named for "the linden trees that grew along the Blanco River", while a 1954 newspaper article noted there were no linden trees present at the site of the community. The Lindendale School originated with a log cabin on a piece of land donated by one J. C. Hoge, and it served as the school for the community until either 1951 or 1949, after which it consolidated into the Blanco Independent School District. The closure of the school came about after transportation improvements spurred on by the Gilmer-Aiken Act. Located in Kendall County on Ranch to Market Road 1888, the community is 24 miles (39 km) northeast of Boerne.
