= Grapetown, Texas =

- Unincorporated community
- Motto: Eintracht schützen Verein (Unity to Protect Society)
- Location within the state of Texas Grapetown (the United States)
- Coordinates: 30°08′51″N 98°46′06″W
- Country: United States
- State: Texas
- County: Gillespie
- Elevation: 1,732 ft (528 m)
- Time zone: UTC-6 (Central (CST))
  - Summer (DST): UTC-5 (CDT)
- Area code: 830
- FIPS code: 48
- GNIS feature ID: 1378377

Grapetown is an unincorporated farming and ranching community 9.5 miles (15.3 km) south of Fredericksburg, situated on South Grape Creek in Gillespie County, in the U.S. state of Texas. It is located on the old Pinta Trail. Grapetown is noted for being the site of the first annual Gillespie County Bundes Schützenfest. The school was designated a Recorded Texas Historic Landmark in 1984, Marker number 10048.

== Settlers and community ==
On December 15, 1847, a petition was submitted to create Gillespie County. In 1848, the legislature formed Gillespie County from Bexar and Travis counties. While the signers were overwhelmingly German immigrants, names also on the petition were Castillo, Pena, Munos, and a handful of non-German Anglo names.

On October 20, 1846, Berlin emigrants Ferdinand Friedrich Wilhelm Doebbler and his wife Auguste Matheus disembarked from the Elise and Charlotte in Galveston, Texas, destined for Fredericksburg. By 1857 they had opened Grapetown's first business entity, Doebbler's Inn and General Store at the crossing of Immigrant Road and Upper South Grape Creek. Doebbler's establishment became a stage stop and community gathering place, eventually including horse stables. The business dissolved in 1915.

On May 13, 1848, John Hemphill was deeded 320 acres (1.29 km^{2}; 0.50 sq mi) on Survey block 187 from John E. Elgin, Abstract 208. On June 19, 1848, Hemphill was deeded 320 acres (1.29 km^{2}; 0.50 sq mi) on Survey block 185 from J.B. Banks, Abstract 50. On November 14, 1848, Hempill was deeded 640 acres (2.59 km^{2}; 1.00 sq mi) on Survey block 183 from Benjamin F. Lyons, Abstract 391. Hemphill became the first rancher of record in Grapetown.

Grapetown ranchers benefited from proximity to Kerrville, where they found a thriving market in selling their cattle to Charles Schreiner. Schreiner, a native of Riquewihr, France, had emigrated to the United States as a teenager with his family in 1852. In the late 1850s, Schreiner and his brother-in-law Caspar Real contracted to supply beef to the United States Army.

== Nueces massacre ==
In 1861, Gillespie County voted 400–17 against secession from the Union. In 1862, the Confederate States of America imposed martial law on Central Texas. Unionists from Kerr, Gillespie, and Kendall counties formed the Union League, a secret organization to support President Abraham Lincoln's policies. Grapetown residents August Hoffman and Heinrich Rausch joined sixty-some conscientious objectors attempting to flee to Mexico. Scottish born Confederate irregular James Duff and his Duff's Partisan Rangers pursued and overtook them at the Nueces River. In what became known as the Nueces massacre, thirty-four were killed, some executed after being taken prisoner. Hoffman and Rausch survived the massacre but took to the hills with 2,000 other conscientious objectors to escape Duff's reign of terror. In 1866, the Treue der Union Monument ("Loyalty to the Union") in Comfort was dedicated to the Texans slain at the Nueces massacre. It is the only monument to the Union outside of the National Cemeteries on Confederate territory. It is one of only six such sites allowed to fly the United States flag at half-mast in perpetuity.

== Grapetown school ==
The first Grapetown school began in the home of Ferdinand Doebbler. On April 1, 1882, Friedrich Baag donated land for a school building, with the stipulation that no political or religious activities be held on the property. Completion of the one-room native limestone structure came in 1884, erected entirely by volunteer labor from local farms and ranches. By 1887, a teacher's residence had also been constructed on the property, later to include a nearby smokehouse. In 1905, the school became Grapetown Line School, District No. 14. In 1949, the school district was consolidated with Rocky Hill School District. The Grapetown Community Club purchased the building in 1950 and continues to use it as a community center.

== Post office ==
Wilhelm Hohenberger became Post Master on November 11, 1885 for the post office established in Doebbler's Inn. The post office was discontinued on March 15, 1888.

== Schützenfest ==
In 1887, Grapetown combined its sängerbund (singing club) and schützenbund (shooting club), and in 1895 Grapetown became the host of the first annual Gillespie County Schützenfest (German "marksmen's festival"). The Grapetown schützenbund is still active and participates in the annual Gillespie County Bundes Schützenfest, sometimes being the host. The county event includes crowning of one or more Schützenkönigs (shooting kings), a parade and a Saengerfest

== Railway ==
On January 3, 1913, the San Antonio, Fredericksburg and Northern Railway was chartered to connect Fredericksburg with the San Antonio and Aransas Pass Railway near Waring, building through Grapetown and neighboring Bankersmith.

Crossing the high ridge between the Guadalupe and Pedernales River basins south of Fredericksburg required the construction of a 920 ft (280 m) long tunnel at a cost of $134,000, and the resultant debt sent the railway into receivership on October 28, 1914. The line was sold under foreclosure on December 31, 1917 to Martin Carle who deeded the property to the Fredericksburg and Northern Railway which had been chartered on December 26 of that year. The train operated until July 27, 1942.

== See also ==
- Fredericksburg, Texas
- Sisterdale, Texas
- Texas Hill Country
