= Bankersmith, Texas =

- Ghost town
- Location within Texas Location within the United States
- Coordinates: 30°08′23″N 98°49′09″W
- Country: USA
- State: Texas
- County: Kendall
- Established: 1913
- Founder: San Antonio, Fredericksburg and Northern Railway

Population
  - Total: 0 (Officially)

Bankersmith (also sometimes written as Banker Smith) is a ghost town in Kendall County, Texas, United States. The town was founded in 1913. It lies approximately halfway between Fredericksburg and Comfort, near the border of Gillespie County.

== History and geography ==
=== Bankersmith Train Station ===
Bankersmith originated in 1913 as a train station along the San Antonio, Fredericksburg and Northern Railway which served nearby Grapetown, Texas, running between Fredericksburg and Comfort. The town and rail station drew its name of "Bankersmith" from Temple Doswell Smith, an important Fredericksburg bank president who financed the railroad. In the early 1940s, the railroad abandoned the line running through Bankersmith.

=== Old Route 9 / Old San Antonio Road ===
Old Route 9 / Old San Antonio Road is the first paved road running north into Fredericksburg, that ran through Bankersmith after the founding of the Bankersmith Train Station.

However, the much later U.S. Route 87 did not pass through Bankersmith. It later became an important alternative route between Fredericksburg and Comfort.

=== Bankersmith Post Office ===
During the 1920s, Bankersmith reached its peak population of approximately 50. The post office was sometimes listed as being in Kendall County and sometimes listed in Gillespie County, depending on the abode of the current Postmaster. It was surrounded by a small business district which served the train station. By the 1940s, the town was all but abandoned and the post office was gone—although some residents persisted into the 1960s.

=== The Old Tunnel of the San Antonio, Fredericksburg and Northern Railway ===
As the town was located in the Texas Hill Country, it is near one of the few railroad tunnels in the state (the only railroad tunnel in Texas when it was constructed). The tunnel is 962 feet (293 m) long, took six months to dig, and cost $134,000 at the time. The tunnel is now part of Old Tunnel State Park and the home to thousands of bats. The Old Tunnel State Park provides a large parking area for would-be visitors, and it is at the intersection of Old San Antonio Road and Alamo Road. Meanwhile, the southern end of the tunnel is at 30°6'2"N and 98°49'15"W.

== Historical population ==
Historical population
Census	Pop.	Note	%±
1930	10		—
1940	10		0.0%
1950	20		100.0%

== Major highways ==
- Old No 9 Hwy

== Plans for Bikinis, Texas ==
In 2012, restaurateur Doug Guller purchased parts of the town on Craigslist, and renamed the town to "Bikinis, Texas" after Bikinis Sports Bar & Grill, his restaurant chain. The purchase price is not known, also some have questioned Guller's ability to rename a town that no longer officially exists.

Guller declared his intentions to turn the town into a tourist destination by creating a hall of fame for the bikini swimsuit, presenting its history beginning with its invention in 1946. Guller has said he had no plans to open a Bikinis Sports Bar & Grill restaurant at the location, but might start a bar inside an abandoned bus there. The bus resides at 30°8'24"N and 98°49'8"W.

In 2015, Guller reverted to the name Bankersmith, wanting to mend fences with Fredericksburg.

As of 2021, Bankersmith, Texas is a fully functioning bar, restaurant, and tourist attraction that proudly claims its history as a ghost town. However, its official address is given as 7905 Old San Antonio Road, Fredericksburg, TX 78624—substantiating the claim that the town no longer exists.
