= Old Tunnel State Park =

State park in Texas, United States

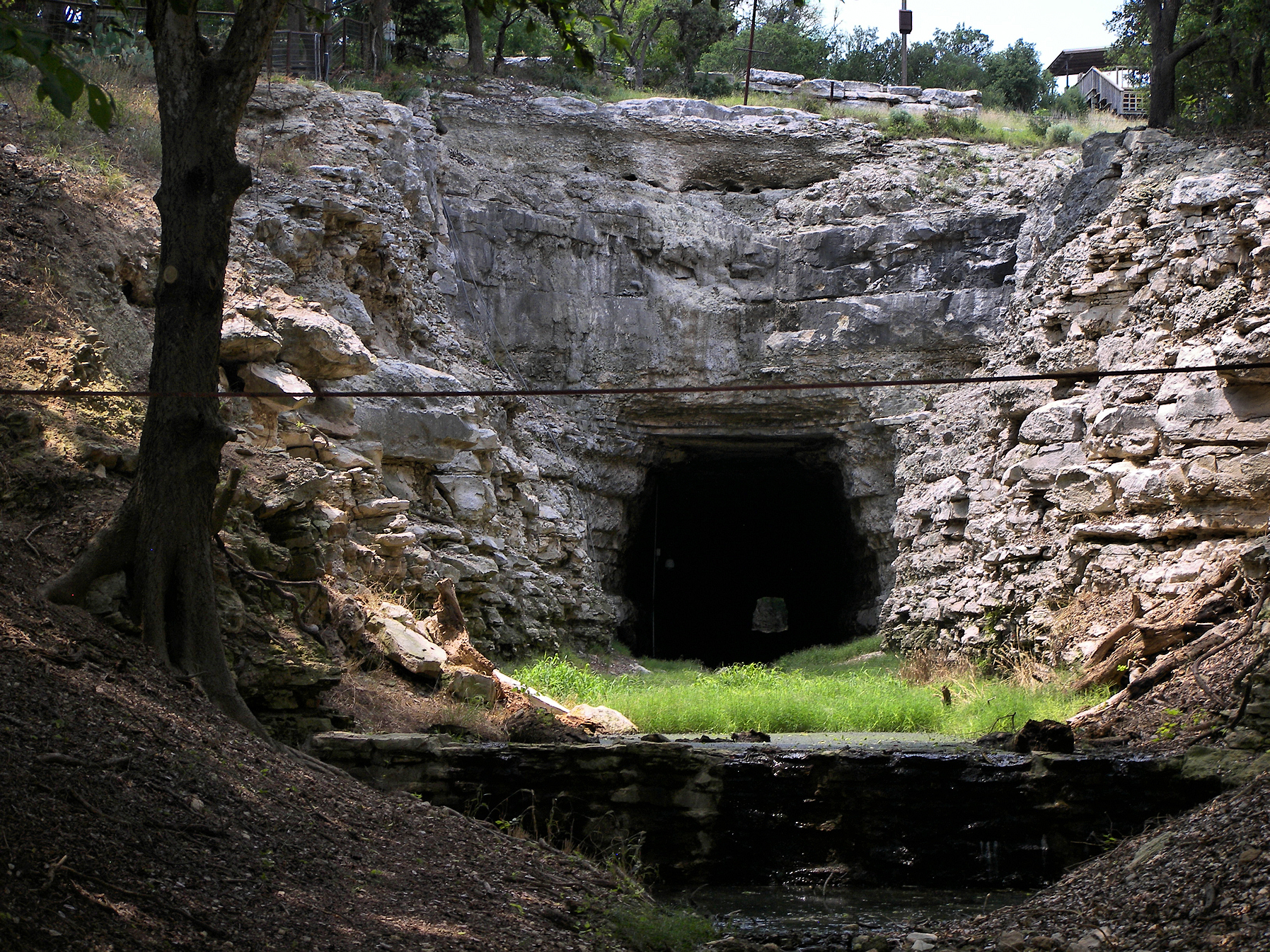
- Old Tunnel

- Location within Texas Location within the United States
- Location: Kendall County, USA
- Nearest city: Fredericksburg; Comfort, Texas
- Coordinates: 30°06′03.6″N 98°49′15.6″W
- Area: 16.1 acres (6.5 ha)
- Established: 1991
- Visitors: 29,163 (in 2025)
- Governing body: Texas Parks and Wildlife Department
- Website: Official site

Old Tunnel State Park is a 16.1 acres (6.5 ha) state park in Kendall County, Texas, United States. It is the smallest state park in Texas. The property is managed by the Texas Parks and Wildlife Department and opened to the public in 2012. It is located halfway between Fredericksburg and Comfort, Texas, on Old San Antonio Road.

The main feature of the park is the 920-foot-long railroad tunnel of the Fredericksburg and Northern Railway most of which was dug by hand through solid limestone. The railway used the tunnel until 1941 when it was dismantled so the steel rails could be used for the World War II effort. Since the shutdown of the railway, the tunnel has become a bat cave, hosting over 3 million Mexican free-tailed bats and 3000 cave myotis bats. The bats emerge at sunset during May through October, and viewing is open to the public. There are two viewing areas to watch the bats from, which require tickets purchased in advance to enter. The park rangers present a program nightly before the bats emerge.

== See also ==
- List of Texas state parks
