= T82 =

T82 may refer to:

- T.82, an image compression standard
- Gillespie County Airport, in Gillespie County, Texas, United States
- Tatra 82, a Czechoslovak truck
