= Pinta Trail (Texas) =

Historic trail in Central Texas

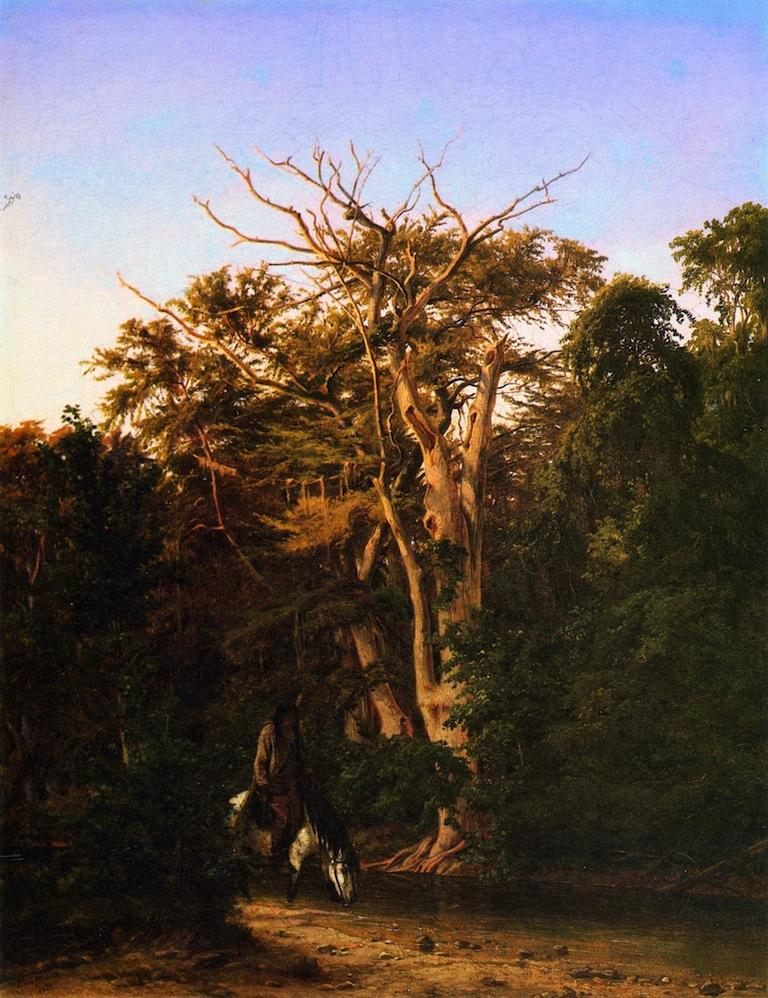
The Old Pinta Crossing on the Guadalupe painted in 1857 by Hermann Lungkwitz

The Pinta Trail is a historic trail in Central Texas that was first traveled by indigenous tribes, and later explorers, settlers, soldiers, and travelers. The 19th-century Germans who settled the Texas Hill Country used part of the Pinta Trail on their journey northward from New Braunfels to found Fredericksburg. A historic battle between a Texas Rangers patrol and a band of Comanches is often said to have occurred near a ford where the Pinta Trail crossed the Guadalupe River.

== Route ==
The Pinta Trail began in San Antonio and proceeded through the Texas Hill Country, crossing the Guadalupe River near Sisterdale and fording the Pedernales River east of Fredericksburg. From there its route is not certain, but it appears to have continued north to the Llano River along a route shown on an 1847 survey map drawn by James P. Hudson.

Historic maps and original Texas land surveys establish that north of San Antonio the trail traversed the Balcones Escarpment through a canyon that is now the route of the Northwest Military Highway. From there, the trail passed Comanche Spring before crossing Cibolo Creek at Post Oak Creek, below Balcones Creek. The trail proceeded northwest to the Guadalaupe River near Sisterdale, crossing Spring Creek, Sabinas Creek, and Wasp Creek on the way. After fording the Guadalupe, the trail followed West Sister Creek to Jung Creek, then followed that stream to its headwaters before crowning a ridge and dropping into the Grape Creek drainage, then fording the Pedernales River about 4.5 miles (7.2 km) east of today’s downtown Fredericksburg.

== History ==
The Pinta Trail makes its first appearance in the journals of Nicolás Lafora and the Marqués de Rubí chronicling a 1767 inspection of Spanish frontier presidios. Leaving the Presidio San Saba, their expedition followed the San Saba Road (which was to the west of the Pinta Trail and was known to German immigrants as the Camino Viejo) until the road reached the Guadalupe River. There, they followed the river until they came to the Pinta Trail ford near today’s Sisterdale, where they picked up the Pinta Trail and followed it to San Antonio. Neither Lafora nor Rubí (nor any other Spanish writer) gave a name to the trail, but geographical landmarks mentioned in Lafora’s journal mark the route clearly.

In April 1846, German settlers under the auspices of the Adelsverein colonization company ventured west from their initial townsite at New Braunfels and picked up the Pinta Trail north of San Antonio, following it to found their next frontier settlement at Fredericksburg. The trail was used by Ferdinand Roemer in January 1847, Lieutenant Francis T. Bryan in June 1849, and John Russell Bartlett in October 1850, all on journeys passing through Fredericksburg. In 1854, Frederick Law Olmsted observed that the lower extent of the trail was overgrown and disused, having been abandoned in favor of a new road that passed through Boerne on the way to Fredericksburg via Welfare, with a branch offering an alternate route through Sisterdale.

In June 1844, a squad of Texas Rangers led by the Captain Jack Hays fought a band of Comanche warriors led by Yellow Wolf in an engagement known as the Battle of Walker’s Creek. The fight is notable for the rangers’ use of the new Colt Paterson 5-shot revolver. One participant in the battle places it at the Pinta Trail ford of the Guadalupe River; another places it about four miles east. Hays’s own report does not mention the Pinta Trail, even though he surveyed the trail at the ford five years earlier.

The Pinta Trail above Sisterdale remained at least partly in use until 1879, but soon thereafter its upper reaches were eclipsed by a road passing through Luckenbach on the way to Fredericksburg.

== Modern roads ==
The only sections of the Pinta Trail that are resembled by modern roads are a short stretch of San Antonio’s Northwest Military Highway through the Balcones Escarpment and, 30 miles (48 km) further north, two miles (3.2 km) of Texas Farm-to-Market Road 1376 above the Guadalupe River. Most of the old trail is on land that is not open to the public.

Though some legends state that the trail connected San Antonio to the abandoned Spanish Presidio San Sabá, there is no historical evidence to support that assertion; those legends, along with other accounts that have the trail passing through Boerne, Comfort, or Menard, confuse the trail with the San Saba Road, the Fredericksburg Road (a variation and extension of the San Saba Road) or other routes. Accounts that have the trail passing through Cain City, Fredericksburg, Luckenbach, or Mason confuse the trail with roads that emerged later. The Pinta Trail did not become the Emigrant Road to California or the Military Road to U.S. Army forts on that route; those roads were established after Fredericksburg was founded.
