= Cain City, Texas =

- Ghost town
- Location within the state of Texas Cain City (the United States)
- Coordinates: 30°11′50″N 98°48′45″W
- Country: United States
- State: Texas
- County: Gillespie
- Elevation: 1,752 ft (534 m)
- Time zone: UTC-6 (Central (CST))
  - Summer (DST): UTC-5 (CDT)
- Area code: 830
- FIPS code: 48-11776
- GNIS feature ID: 1378083

Cain City is a ghost town founded in 1915, 4 miles (6.4 km) southeast of Fredericksburg in Gillespie County, in the U.S. state of Texas. It was established to be a station stop of the Fredericksburg and Northern Railway Company, of which the city's namesake Charlie Cain was a leading fundraiser. The town suffered an economic downturn within a decade of being founded.

== Charlie Cain ==
Charles Matthew Cain was born one of six children on December 12, 1881, in the Robertson County town of Calvert, Texas. His parents were Dr. Whitfield Hardy Cain, D.D.S. of Mississippi, and Elizabeth "Lizzie" Briscoe Cain of Tennessee. His siblings were John G. Cain; Briscoe Whitfield Cain, D.D.S.; Claude Duval Cain; Phillip Jackson Cain; Grover Cleveland Cain; Walker Hunter Cain; and Lizzie (Townsend) Cain.

Cain was educated in the public schools of Calvert, Texas, but he left school at an early age and went to Houston to seek his fortune. In 1902, Charlie (or Charley) Cain began his career as a stock room employee of the Peden Iron and Steel Company in Houston, a company established by Edward Andrew Peden in 1902. After a period as road salesman for Peden, Cain became manager of Peden's San Antonio branch when it opened in 1910. In 1912, Cain was instrumental in raising $50,000 for the building of the Fredericksburg and Northern Railway. Cain died in Hondo, Texas, on September 12, 1970.

== Cain City ==
On January 3, 1913, the San Antonio, Fredericksburg and Northern Railway was chartered to connect Fredericksburg with the San Antonio and Aransas Pass Railway near Waring. The initial board of directors consisted of James M. Dobie of Cotulla; C. B. Lucas of Berclair; Richard R. Russell, Thomas E. Mathis, W. W. Collier, J. H. Haile, and J. L. Browne, of San Antonio. A 920-foot (280 m) long railroad tunnel was built at the cost of $134,000, which sent the railroad into receivership on October 28, 1914. It was sold under foreclosure on December 31, 1917, to Martin Carle, who deeded the property to the Fredericksburg and Northern Railway, which had been chartered on December 26 of that year. The train operated until July 27, 1942, when the rail line was sold by the War Department. Another source says "[t]he railroad ceased operation on October 1, 1944."

In 1913, San Antonio banker J.C. Stinson bought 324 acres (1.31 km^{2}; 0.51 sq mi) in Gillespie County, in anticipation of the construction of the Fredericksburg and Northern Railway. Surveyor A.J. Green laid out the town they named after Charlie Cain of San Antonio. The Cain City train depot established the area as an important shipping destination. Within a year, a water system was developed, and Cain City had a rural road connection to Luckenbach.

Tom Schmidt opened Farmers' Produce Company warehouse, and Alfred Jung established a lumberyard. Anticipated prosperity brought a telephone exchange and two general stores. A schoolhouse was established, with Katie Striegler as teacher. Hugo Pahl, also serving as the railroad agent, was Cain City's first postmaster in 1915. Robert Price succeeded him that same year, with George Price being appointed the town's last postmaster in 1919. In July 1916, the Cain City State Bank was added as a member of the Texas Bankers Association, with Stinson as its president. The bank only lasted a few years before it shut down completely. Stinson moved back to San Antonio in 1922.

In 1919, Gus Bausch opened a cotton gin, but prosperity was already waning in the town. The Mountain Home Hotel, opened by Mrs. Fletcher Hamilton of Illinois, was bought by J.C. Stinson and eventually sold to Mrs. Will Bird. When the town experienced an economic downturn, Bird razed the hotel. Edgar Tatsch and Theodore Keller opened a dance hall in 1927, but by that time the town was already in an advanced state of decline. Today Cain City is a ghost town.

== Notable person ==
- Harold Billings (November 12, 1931 – November 29, 2017) Editor, author, retired librarian instrumental in developing national and state library networking and resource sharing among libraries. Born in Cain City.
