= Edward Dahlberg =

American writer

Edward Dahlberg (July 22, 1900 – February 27, 1977) was an American novelist, essayist, and autobiographer.

== Background ==
Edward Dahlberg was born in Boston, Massachusetts, to Elizabeth Dahlberg. Together, mother and son led a vagabond existence until 1905 when she operated the Star Lady Barbershop in Kansas City. Edward was sent to a Catholic orphanage in Kansas City at the age of six for one year. In April 1912, Dahlberg was sent to the Jewish Orphan Asylum in Cleveland, Ohio, where he lived until 1917. He eventually attended the University of California, Berkeley (1922–23) and Columbia University (B.S. in philosophy. 1925).

== Career ==
Dahlberg enlisted in the U.S. Army during World War I, in which he lost the use of an eye after being struck with a rifle butt. In the late 1920s, Dahlberg became part of the expatriate group of American writers living in Paris. His first novel, Bottom Dogs, was based on his childhood experiences at the orphanage and his travels in the American West; it was published in London with an introduction by D. H. Lawrence. With his advance money, Dahlberg returned to New York City and resided in Greenwich Village. In 1933 he visited Germany, where he wrote anti-Nazi articles for The Times and counseled many German intellectuals, Jews, communists and anarchists to flee Germany. In 1934 he published the first American anti-Nazi novel, Those Who Perish. From the 1940s onwards, Dahlberg made his living as an author and also taught at various colleges and universities. From 1944 to 1948 he taught at Boston University. In 1948, he taught briefly at the experimental Black Mountain College. He was replaced on the staff by his friend and fellow author, Charles Olson.

During his years as an expatriate writer in 1920s Paris, he knew James Joyce, Samuel Beckett, Sean O'Casey, Ernest Hemingway, F. Scott Fitzgerald, T.S. Eliot, Ezra Pound, W. B. Yeats, D. H. Lawrence and many others. A proletarian novelist of the 1930s, a spokesman for a fundamental humanism in the 1940s, he was an important member and editor for the Stieglitz Group, which promoted human rights all over the world. He spoke out against the mistreatment of African Americans, Indigenous Americans (Native Americans), Jews, immigrants, and workers. He was jailed three or four times for standing up to inhumanity. For a number of years, Dahlberg devoted himself to literary study. His extensive readings of the works of Dante, Shakespeare, Thoreau, Sir Thomas Browne, Robert Burton, Isaac D'Israeli, and many others resulted in a writing style quite different from the social realism that characterized his earlier writing.

He moved to the Danish island of Bornholm in 1955 while working on The Flea of Sodom. The Sorrows of Priapus was published in 1957, becoming his most successful book thus far. He later moved to Sóller, on Mallorca, while working on Because I Was Flesh, an autobiography which was published in 1964 and which was nominated for the National Book Award. During the 1960s and 1970s, he became quite prolific and further refined his unique style through the publication of poetry, autobiographical works, fiction and criticism. He also lived in Dublin and Wicklow, London, Madrid, Malaga, Mexico City and the Seychelles.

== Personal life ==
In 1942 he married Winifred Donlea O'Carroll. Winifred had two children from her previous marriage to the writer and professor Harry Thornton Moore. Edward and Winifred had two children together. His second marriage was to R'lene LaFleur Howell in 1950 and his third, in 1967, to his longtime mistress, Julia Lawlor. Edward, R'lene, and Julia lived in Dublin from the early 1960s to the early 1970s where Edward was a member of an Irish literary group that met at McDaid's Pub near Trinity College, Dublin. Members of this group included Frank O'Connor, Brendan Behan and Dominic Behan, Patrick Kavanagh, James Liddy, Garech Browne, Patrick Galvin and occasionally Frank McCourt and many others, with music often provided by The Dubliners. In 1968, he was elected to the National Institute of Arts and Letters. In 1976, he was awarded a Guggenheim Fellowship. Dahlberg died in Santa Barbara, California, on February 27, 1977.

== Selected works ==
- 1929 – Bottom Dogs (novel)
- 1932 – From Flushing to Calvary (novel)
- 1934 – Those Who Perish (novel)
- 1941 – Do These Bones Live (essays, cultural criticism)
- 1947 – Sing O Barren (revision of Do These Bones Live)
- 1950 – Flea of Sodom (essays and parables)
- 1957 – The Sorrows of Priapus (essay)
- 1960 – Can These Bones Live (second revision of Do These Bones Live)
- 1961 – Truth Is More Sacred: A Critical Exchange on Modern Literature with Sir Herbert Read
- 1964 – Because I Was Flesh (autobiography)
- 1964 – Alms for Oblivion (essays and reminiscences)
- 1965 – Reasons of the Heart: Maxims
- 1966 – Cipango’s Hinder Door (poems)
- 1967 – The Dahlberg Reader, ed. Paul Carroll (poet)
- 1967 – Epitaphs of Our Times (letters)
- 1967 – The Leafless American (miscellany)
- 1968 – The Carnal Myth: A Search Into Classical Sensuality (essay)
- 1971 – The Confessions of Edward Dahlberg (autobiography)
- 1972 - The Sorrows of Priapus, consisting of The Sorrows of Priapus and The Carnal Myth (essays)
- 1972 – (editor) The Gold of Ophir: Travels, myths, and legends in the New World
- 1976 – The Olive of Minerva: Or, The Comedy of a Cuckold (novel)
- 1989 – Samuel Beckett's Wake & Other Uncollected Prose
- 1990 – In Love, In Sorrow: The Complete Correspondence of Charles Olson and Edward Dahlberg, ed. Paul Christensen

== Legacy ==
Dahlberg is the subject of the title essay of Jonathan Lethem's The Disappointment Artist, a 2006 essay collection. In his 2005 memoir Teacher Man, Frank McCourt remembered Dahlberg as an exceptionally belittling personality who enjoyed bullying his party guests. McCourt recounted that on their first meeting, Dahlberg insulted McCourt unprovoked and then threw McCourt out of Dahlberg's cocktail party.

== Other sources ==
- Billings, Harold. A Bibliography of Edward Dahlberg (Harry Ransom Humanities; 1971) ISBN 978-0-87959-037-6
- Cech, John. Charles Olson and Edward Dahlberg: A Portrait of a Friendship (ESL Monography, University of Victoria, 1982)
- Moramarco, Fred S. Edward Dahlberg (Twayne Publishing. 1972) ISBN 978-0-8057-0180-7
- DeFanti, Charles. The Wages of Expectation: A Biography of Edward Dahlberg (New York University Press. 1978) ISBN 978-0-8147-1764-6
- Lethem, Jonathan. The Disappointment Artist (Doubleday: 2005) ISBN 0-385-51217-1
- Solomon, William. Literature, Amusement, and Technology in the Great Depression (Cambridge University Press: 2002) ISBN 0-521-81343-3
- Williams, Jonathan, ed. Edward Dahlberg: A Tribute (Northwestern University Press, 1970)
