= Fredericksburg Theater Company =

American non-profit organization

Fredericksburg Theater Company is a non-profit organization, founded in Fredericksburg, Texas, by former mayor Jeryl Hoover. BroadwayWorld's readers voted the company Best Theatre in the San Antonio Region in 2018.

The Kerrville Daily Times posts updates of upcoming performances of the Fredericksburg Theater Company. The company's performances take place in the Steve W Shepherd Theater, which has a capacity of 250 seats.
