= Harold Billings =

American librarian, editor and author (1931-2017)

- Born: Harold Wayne Billings; November 12, 1931; Cain City, Texas
- Died: November 29, 2017 (aged 86); Austin, Texas
- Education: University of Texas; Pan American University
- Occupations: Author; Editor; Librarian
- Known for: Library resource sharing system
- Awards: Hugh C. Atkinson Memorial Award; Morley-Montgomery Award; Librarian Emeritus, University of Texas

Harold Wayne Billings (November 12, 1931 – November 29, 2017) was an American librarian, editor and author best known for his role in developing national and state library networking and resource sharing among libraries.

== Career ==
Billings received his BA from Pan American College (now Pan American University) in 1953 and his MLS from University of Texas in 1957. He taught high school English, physics, and chemistry in Pharr, Texas 1953–54 before beginning work at the University of Texas Library, Austin. Billings progressed from cataloguer, 1954–57, to assistant chief catalogue librarian, 1957–64, acquisitions librarian, 1965–67, assistant university librarian, 1967–72, associate director of General Libraries, 1972–1977 and finally director of General Libraries, 1978–2003, when he retired.

Commenting on one of his articles, Pam North wrote "I believe he has captured what should be at the heart of every librarian. I know it is at the center of mine." A number of his best professional articles were collected in Magic and Hypersystems: Constructing the Information Sharing Library (2002). As one review concluded, Billings "has been instrumental in guiding the library into the digital future over the past 25 years. His essays challenge librarians to accept needed change and allow it to form the library of the future." In 2003 the American Library Association awarded him its annual Hugh C. Atkinson Memorial Award for his "long commitment to innovation in automation, resource sharing, and creative management."

== Literary studies ==
In addition to his career as librarian, Billings edited and wrote extensively about various authors. Reflecting a long-time interest in Arthur Conan Doyle, in 2006 he received the Morley-Montgomery Award for his essay "The Materia Medica of Sherlock Holmes".

Billings' most extensive literary studies involved two disparate authors who he suggested share a fascination with the Biblical Job, American novelist and essayist Edward Dahlberg (1900–1977) and Anglo-West Indian novelist M. P. Shiel (1865–1947)

Billings helped gather an archive of Shiel's works and documents for the Harry Ransom Humanities Research Center. Beginning in 1958 with 115 books collected by A. Reynolds Morse for his bibliography, The Works of M. P. Shiel (1948), and eventually including hundreds of letters and manuscripts largely obtained from Shiel's literary executor, John Gawsworth, the Harry Ransom Center collection of Shiel material is the most extensive in the world.

After retirement Billings returned to a biography of Shiel which he started in the 1960s, but set aside to concentrate on Dahlberg. Four chapters from his early draft were included in M. P. Shiel in Diverse Hands: a Collection of Essays on M. P. Shiel (1983). Billings extensively revised and expanded this material with much original research drawn from the Ransom Center archive and other sources. The first volume of a projected trilogy was published in 2005, M.P. Shiel : A Biography of His Early Years, of which a reviewer stated: "Billings has ferreted out much useful information concerning Shiel, whose personal life has not previously been so effectively presented, and his placement of Shiel within Nineties cultural movements is likewise judiciously done.". A second volume, M.P. Shiel: The Middle Years 1897–1923 was released in 2010, while the concluding volume covering Shiel's final decades was published in 2016 under the title "An Ossuary For M.P. Shiel: The Final Years 1923–1947" (Bucharest: Mount Abraxas / Ex Occidente, 2016.) Billings has turned to writing supernatural literary fiction in subsequent years, "A Dead Church" (Bucharest: Ex Occidente, 2015), "The Monk's Bible" (Bucharest: Ex Occidente, 2016), "The Daughters of Lilith and Other Tales" (Bucharest: Mount Abraxas / Ex Occidente, 2016).

== Bibliography ==
- The Education of Librarians in Texas, (Austin: University of Texas, 1956.)
- Nuns Walking, (privately printed, 1961.)
- A Bibliography of Edward Dahlberg, (Austin: University of Texas Press, 1971.)
- Magic & Hypersystems: Constructing the Information-Sharing Library, (American Library Assn. 2002) (ISBN 0-8389-0834-9)
- Texas Beast Fables (Austin: Roger Beacham, Publisher, 2006) (ISBN 0-9766044-2-6)
- M. P. Shiel: A Biography of His Early Years, (Austin: Roger Beacham, Publisher 2005) (ISBN 0-9766044-0-X)
- M. P. Shiel: The Middle Years 1897–1923, (Austin: Roger Beacham, Publisher 2010) (ISBN 978-0-9766044-5-7)
- An Ossuary for M.P. Shiel: The Final Years 1923–1947(Bucharest: Ex Occidente 2016)
- A Dead Church (Bucharest: Ex Occidente 2015
- The Monk's Bible (Bucharest: Ex Occidente 2016
- The Daughters of Lilith and Other Tales (Bucharest: Mount Abraxas / Ex Occidente 2016

=== Collections edited ===
- (Editor and author of introduction) Edward Dahlberg, The Leafless American, ([Sausalito, CA.]: Roger Beacham, Publisher 1967.)
- (Editor and author of introduction) Edward Dahlberg, American Ishmael of Letters, (Austin: Roger Beacham, Publisher 1968.)
- (Editor and author of introduction) Edward Dahlberg, Bottom Dogs, From Flushing To Calvary, Those Who Perish And Hitherto Unpublished And Uncollected Works, (Crowell, 1976.)
- (Editor and author of introduction) Edward Dahlberg, The Leafless American and Other Writings, (New Paltz, NY: McPherson, 1986.)
