= Fredericksburg and Northern Railway =

Connector railroad

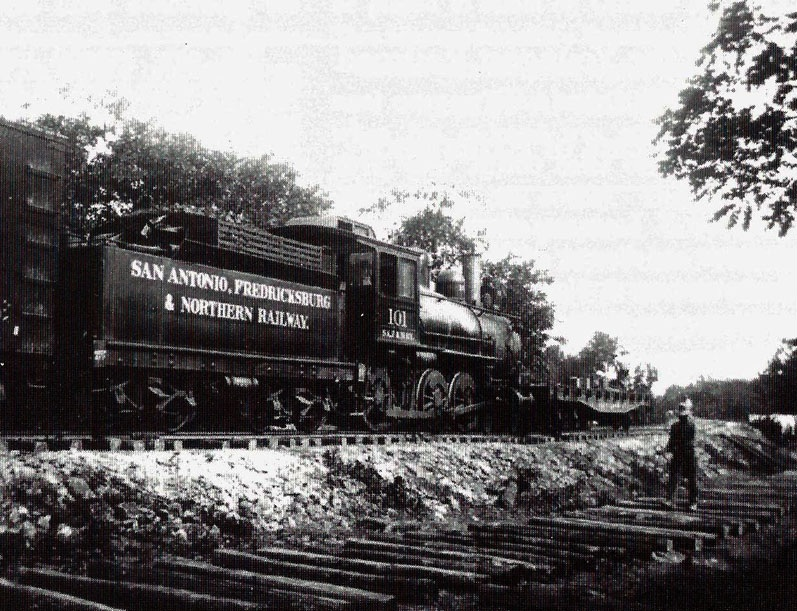
San Antonio, Fredericksburg & Northern Locomotive 101.

The Fredericksburg & Northern Railway was a connector line between Fredericksburg, Texas, and the San Antonio and Aransas Pass Railway (SA&AP). It operated under that name from 1917 until 1942. From 1913 to 1917, it was operated as the San Antonio, Fredericksburg & Northern Railway.

== History ==
After the Civil War, Fredericksburg wanted to connect to the existing San Antonio and Aransas Pass Railway for a speedier method of delivering their products to the San Antonio marketplace. After the disappointment of the SA&AP building a connector line only as far as Kerrville, businessmen in Fredericksburg began to formulate a plan to raise capital to build a line connecting with the SA&AP. $30,000 in capital stock was issued. An additional $200,000 was raised to pay the contractor to build the line. In 1913, the San Antonio, Fredericksburg & Northern Railway Company was chartered. While building the line, a 920-foot (280m) long tunnel was chosen over switchbacks to accommodate a rapid elevation change and difficult terrain. This increased the cost by $134,000 and required five months of hard labor. The first train rolled down the line and through the new tunnel on August 16, 1913. Cain City was originally established as a stop for the new line. The added cost of building the tunnel sent the new company into receivership in 1914.

The railway was deeded over to the newly chartered Fredericksburg & Northern Railway Company by Martin Carle, who had purchased the property December 31, 1917, under a foreclosure sale. The F&N line continued to operate until World War II, but failed to turn enough profit to pay off the original debt incurred in 1917 for its purchase. On July 25, 1942, the United States War Department approved the application of owner Dr. O. H. Judkins to cease operations of the railway. The track was sold for scrap. The tunnel is now home for up to three million Mexican free-tailed bats and 3,000 cave myotis from May through October. The tunnel and surrounding land is part of Old Tunnel State Park.
