= Gillespie County Airport =

Airport in Texas, United States

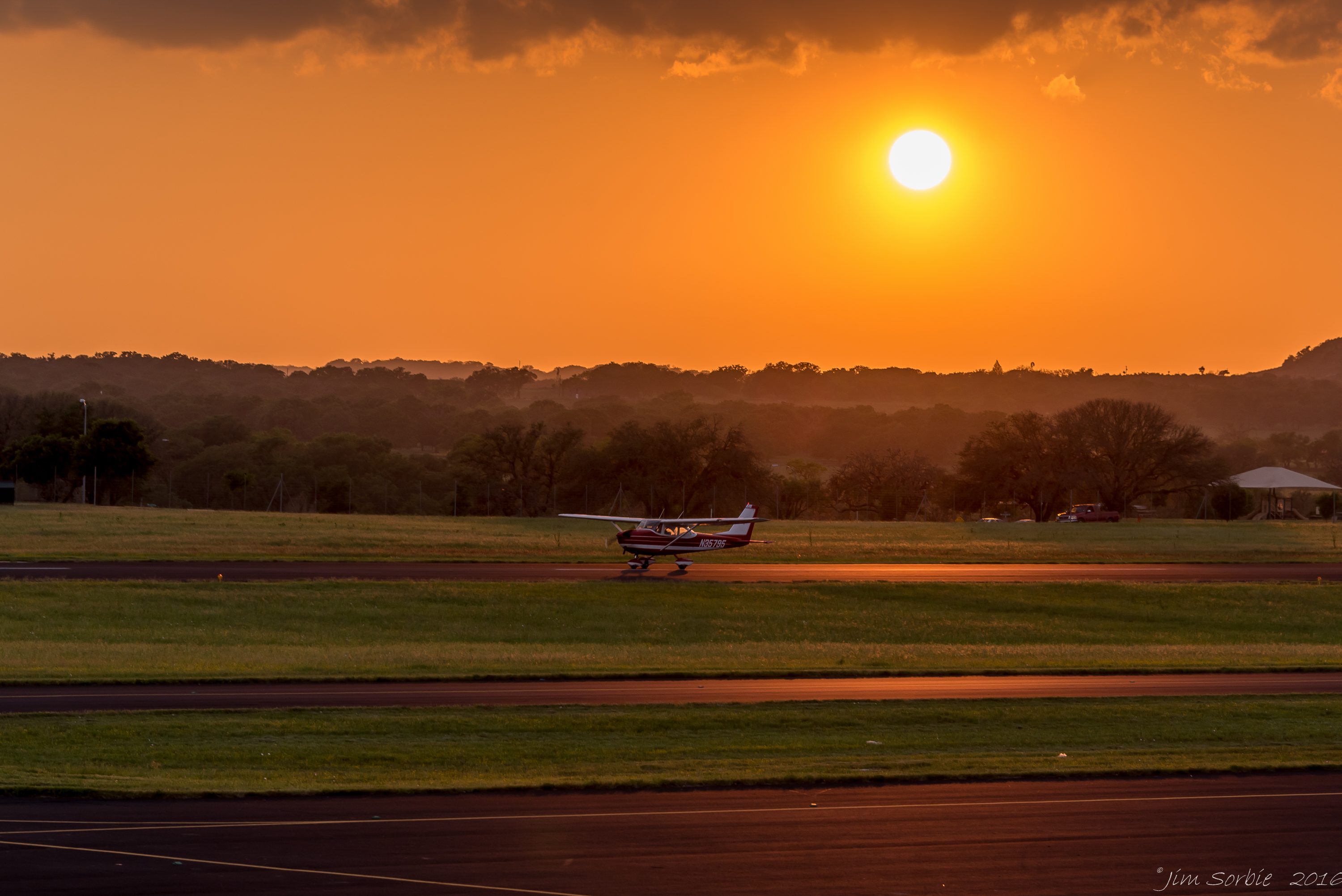
- IATA: none; ICAO: none; FAA LID: T82

Summary
- Airport type: Public
- Owner: Gillespie County
- Serves: Fredericksburg, Texas
- Elevation AMSL: 1,695 ft (517 m)
- Coordinates: 30°14′36″N 098°54′33″W

Map
- Location in Texas

Runways
Direction	Length		Surface
Direction	ft	m	Surface
14/32	5,001	1,524	Asphalt

Statistics (2011)
- Aircraft operations: 15,675
- Based aircraft: 61
- Source: Federal Aviation Administration

Gillespie County Airport (FAA LID: T82) is in and owned by Gillespie County, Texas; it is three miles southwest of Fredericksburg, Texas. The National Plan of Integrated Airport Systems for 2011–2015 categorized it as a general aviation facility.

== Facilities ==
Gillespie County Airport covers 216 acres (87 ha) at an elevation of 1,695 feet (517 m). Its runway (14/32) is 5,001 by 75 feet (1,524 x 23 m) asphalt.

In the year ending August 5, 2011, the airport had 15,675 aircraft operations, average 42 per day: 98% general aviation, 1% air taxi, and 1% military. 61 aircraft were then based at this airport: 82% single-engine, 13% multi-engine, 3% helicopter, and 2% jet.

== See also ==
- List of airports in Texas
