= Fredericksburg, Texas =

- City
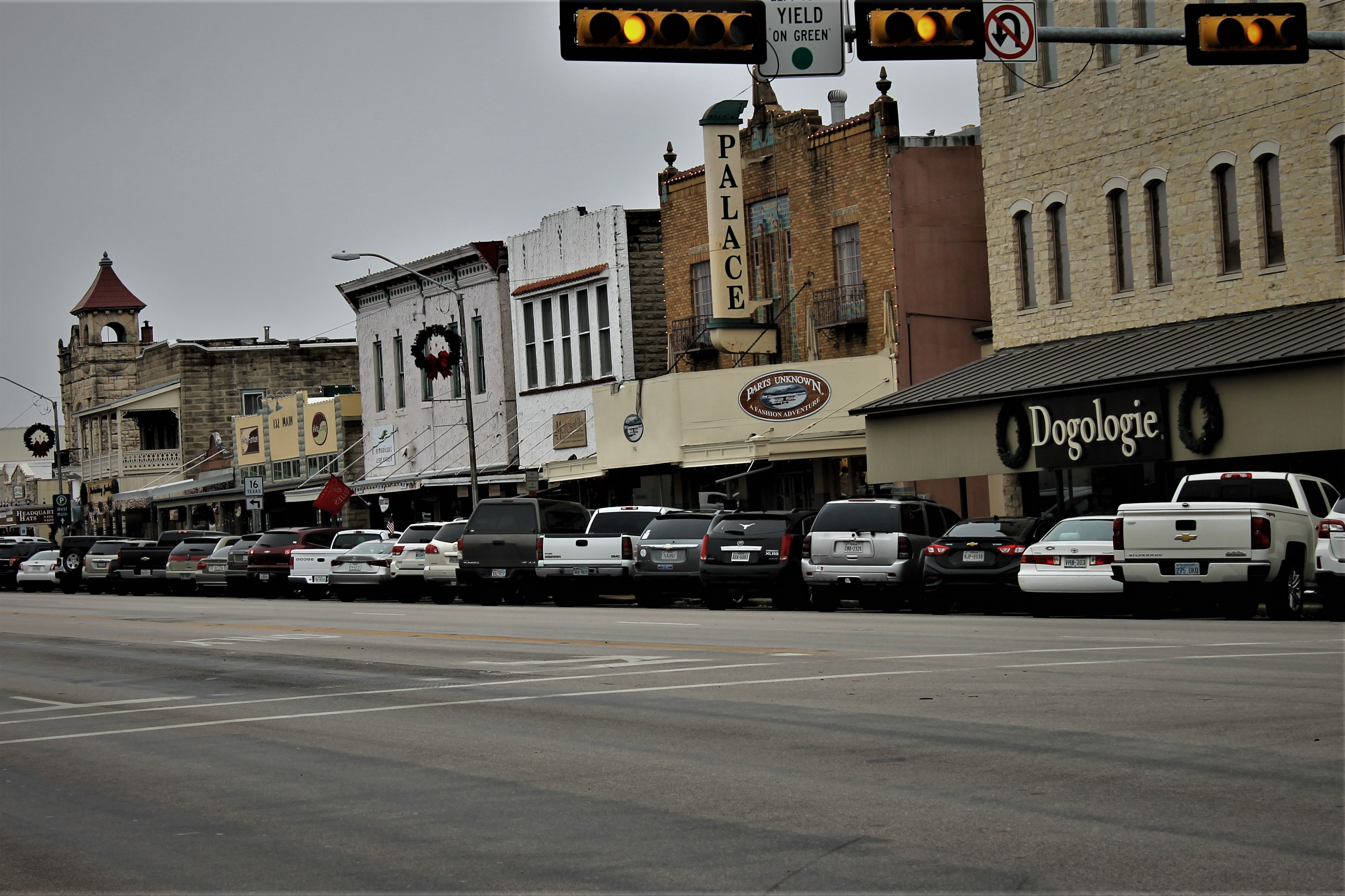
- East end of downtown Fredericksburg

- Seal
- Nicknames: Fritztown,
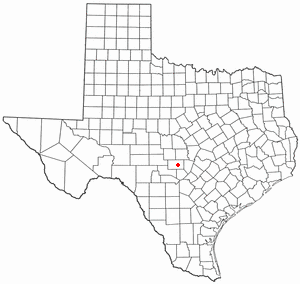
- Location of Fredericksburg, Texas

- Coordinates: 30°15′50″N 98°52′29″W
- Country: United States
- State: Texas
- County: Gillespie
- Named for: Prince Frederick of Prussia

Area
  - Total: 9.25 sq mi (23.95 km^{2})
  - Land: 9.19 sq mi (23.81 km^{2})
  - Water: 0.054 sq mi (0.14 km^{2})
- Elevation: 1,723 ft (525 m)

Population (2020)
  - Total: 10,875
  - Density: 1,183/sq mi (456.7/km^{2})
- Time zone: UTC−06:00 (Central (CST))
  - Summer (DST): UTC−05:00 (CDT)
- ZIP Code: 78624
- Area code: 830
- FIPS code: 48-27348
- GNIS feature ID: 2410542
- Website: www.fbgtx.org

Fredericksburg is a city in and the county seat of Gillespie County, Texas, United States. As of the 2020 Census, the city had a population of 10,875.

Fredericksburg was founded in 1846 and named after Prince Frederick of Prussia. Old-time German residents often referred to Fredericksburg as Fritztown, a nickname that is still used by some businesses. It is located 70 miles northwest of San Antonio, and approximately 80 miles west of Austin. The city is also the center of Texas German, a dialect spoken by the first generation of German settlers who initially refused to learn English. Fredericksburg shares many cultural characteristics with New Braunfels, which had been established by Prince Carl of Solms-Braunfels the previous year. Fredericksburg is the birthplace of Fleet Admiral Chester Nimitz. It is the sister city of Montabaur, Germany. On October 14, 1970, the Fredericksburg Historic District was added to the National Register of Historic Places in Texas.

== Geography ==
Fredericksburg is located east of the center of Gillespie County 70 miles (110 km) north of San Antonio and 78 mi (126 km) west of Austin.

According to the United States Census Bureau, the city has a total area of 8.6 sq mi (22.3 km^{2}), of which 30 acres (0.12 km^{2}), or 0.55%, is covered by water.

=== Enchanted Rock ===
Enchanted Rock is a geographical landmark 27 km (17 mi) north of Fredericksburg in Llano County. The rock is a huge, pink granite exfoliation dome that rises 425 ft (130 m) above the surrounding land, has a summit elevation of 1,825 ft (556 m) above sea level, and covers 640 acres (260 ha). Enchanted Rock offers 8.4 mi of hiking trails, camping, picnicking, rock climbing, and other outdoor activities. It is one of the largest batholiths (underground rock formation uncovered by erosion) in the United States, and was declared a National Natural Landmark in 1970. In 1994, the State of Texas opened it as Enchanted Rock State Natural Area after adding facilities. The same year, Enchanted Rock was added to the National Register of Historic Places.

=== Balanced Rock ===
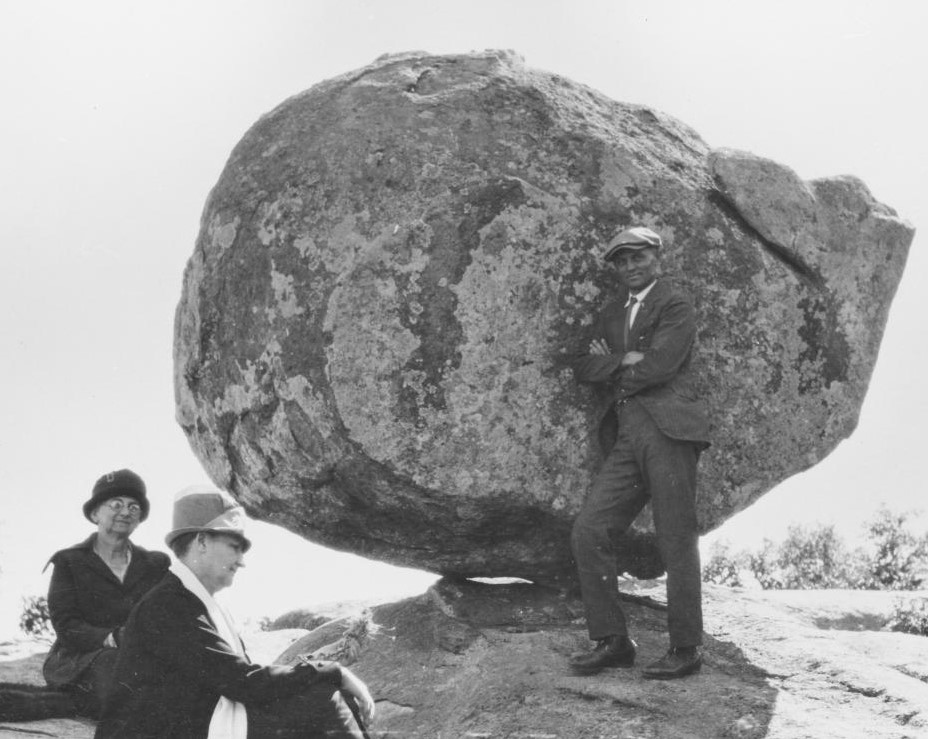
Balanced Rock, date unknown

Balanced Rock was a famous local landmark that perched atop Bear Mountain 16 km (10 mi) north of Fredericksburg. The natural wonder stone pillar, precariously balanced on its small tip. It fell prey to vandals, who dynamited it off its base in April 1986.

=== Cross Mountain ===
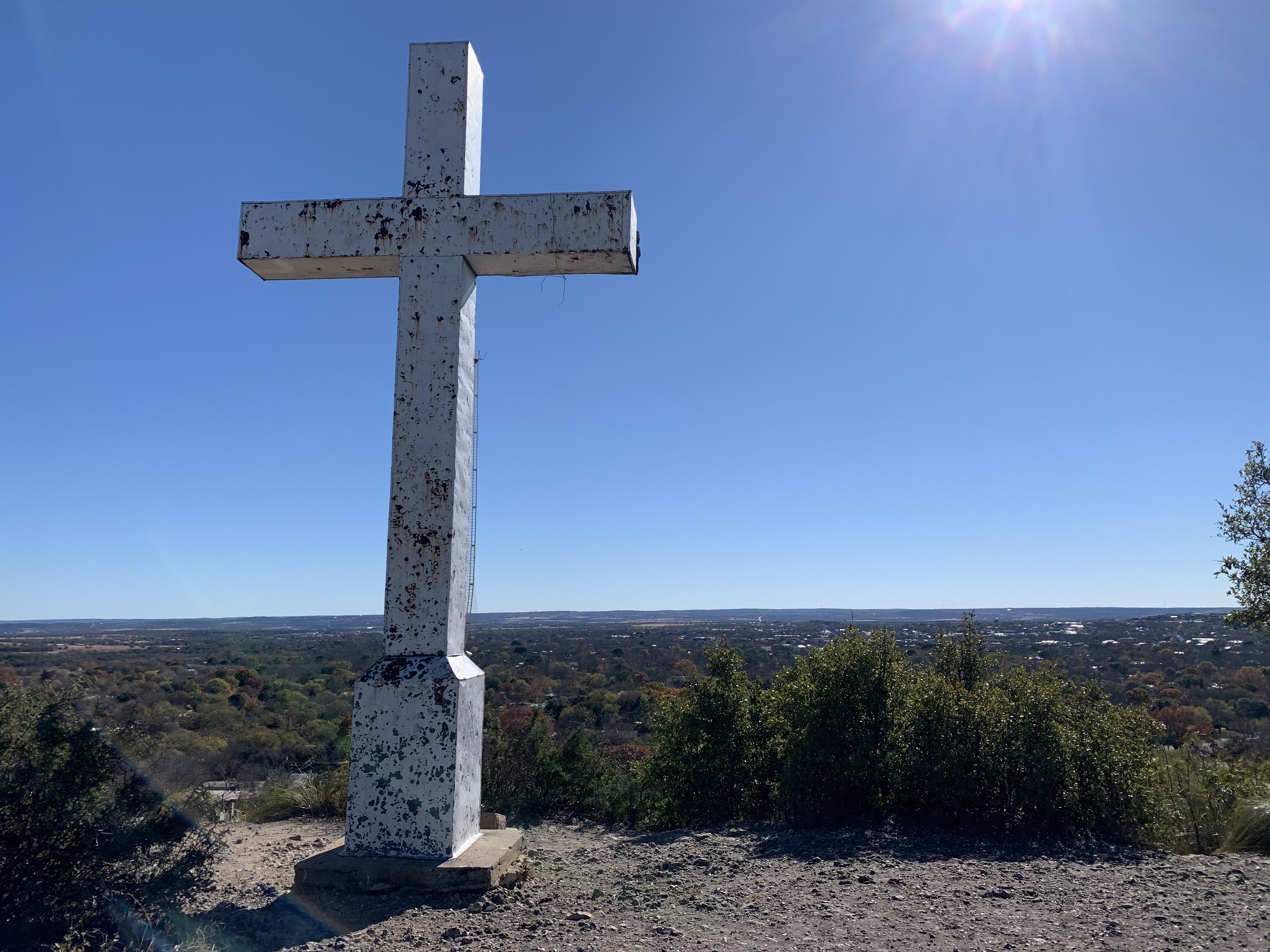
Cross Mountain overlooking Fredericksburg in 2020

The first known record of Cross Mountain (elevation 584 m (1,916 ft)) was in 1847 by Ferdinand von Roemer. Native Americans used the location to signal each other about intrusions into their territory. The area was part of settler John Christian Durst's 10-acre (4.0 ha) allotment. Durst found a timber cross on the mountain, indicating that Spanish missionaries had once used the site. Durst named the place "Kreuzberg" or Cross Mountain. In 1849, Father George Menzel erected a new cross. In 1946, St. Mary's Catholic Church erected a metal and concrete cross. The mountain has been used both for the Easter Fires pageant and for Easter sunrise services. It was designated a Recorded Texas Historic Landmark 1976.

=== Climate ===
Fredericksburg experiences a humid subtropical climate (Köppen: Cfa), with hot summers and generally mild winters. Average temperatures range from 82 °F (28 °C) in the summer to 47 °F (8 °C) during winter.

Climate data for Fredericksburg, Texas (1991–2020 normals, extremes 1896–1915, 1939–present)
Month	Jan	Feb	Mar	Apr	May	Jun	Jul	Aug	Sep	Oct	Nov	Dec	Year
Record high °F (°C)	90 (32)	96 (36)	101 (38)	104 (40)	103 (39)	108 (42)	109 (43)	109 (43)	109 (43)	102 (39)	92 (33)	88 (31)	109 (43)
Mean maximum °F (°C)	78.7 (25.9)	81.9 (27.7)	86.6 (30.3)	90.9 (32.7)	95.0 (35.0)	97.6 (36.4)	99.8 (37.7)	101.0 (38.3)	97.1 (36.2)	91.1 (32.8)	82.8 (28.2)	78.7 (25.9)	101.7 (38.7)
Mean daily maximum °F (°C)	59.8 (15.4)	63.8 (17.7)	70.7 (21.5)	78.0 (25.6)	84.0 (28.9)	90.3 (32.4)	93.4 (34.1)	94.2 (34.6)	87.9 (31.1)	79.1 (26.2)	68.2 (20.1)	61.4 (16.3)	77.6 (25.3)
Daily mean °F (°C)	47.0 (8.3)	51.2 (10.7)	58.3 (14.6)	65.6 (18.7)	73.3 (22.9)	79.4 (26.3)	82.1 (27.8)	82.2 (27.9)	76.0 (24.4)	66.7 (19.3)	56.1 (13.4)	48.6 (9.2)	65.5 (18.6)
Mean daily minimum °F (°C)	34.2 (1.2)	38.5 (3.6)	45.9 (7.7)	53.2 (11.8)	62.5 (16.9)	68.5 (20.3)	70.7 (21.5)	70.2 (21.2)	64.1 (17.8)	54.2 (12.3)	43.9 (6.6)	35.8 (2.1)	53.5 (11.9)
Mean minimum °F (°C)	20.3 (−6.5)	22.9 (−5.1)	27.1 (−2.7)	35.7 (2.1)	46.7 (8.2)	59.5 (15.3)	64.6 (18.1)	62.8 (17.1)	50.3 (10.2)	36.3 (2.4)	26.2 (−3.2)	21.4 (−5.9)	17.6 (−8.0)
Record low °F (°C)	−5 (−21)	−3 (−19)	12 (−11)	24 (−4)	37 (3)	48 (9)	55 (13)	54 (12)	35 (2)	24 (−4)	12 (−11)	1 (−17)	−5 (−21)
Average precipitation inches (mm)	1.56 (40)	1.84 (47)	2.50 (64)	2.55 (65)	4.26 (108)	2.98 (76)	1.88 (48)	2.42 (61)	3.25 (83)	3.10 (79)	2.18 (55)	2.04 (52)	30.56 (776)
Average snowfall inches (cm)	0.0 (0.0)	0.1 (0.25)	0.0 (0.0)	0.0 (0.0)	0.0 (0.0)	0.0 (0.0)	0.0 (0.0)	0.0 (0.0)	0.0 (0.0)	0.0 (0.0)	0.1 (0.25)	0.0 (0.0)	0.2 (0.51)
Average precipitation days (≥ 0.01 in)	7.0	7.2	8.4	6.4	8.1	6.2	4.5	5.2	6.3	6.5	6.8	7.0	79.6
Average snowy days (≥ 0.1 in)	0.0	0.1	0.0	0.0	0.0	0.0	0.0	0.0	0.0	0.0	0.0	0.0	0.0
Source: NOAA

== Architecture ==
The Vereins Kirche, the Pioneer Museum Complex, Pioneer Memorial Library, and other architecture.

== Churches and religion ==
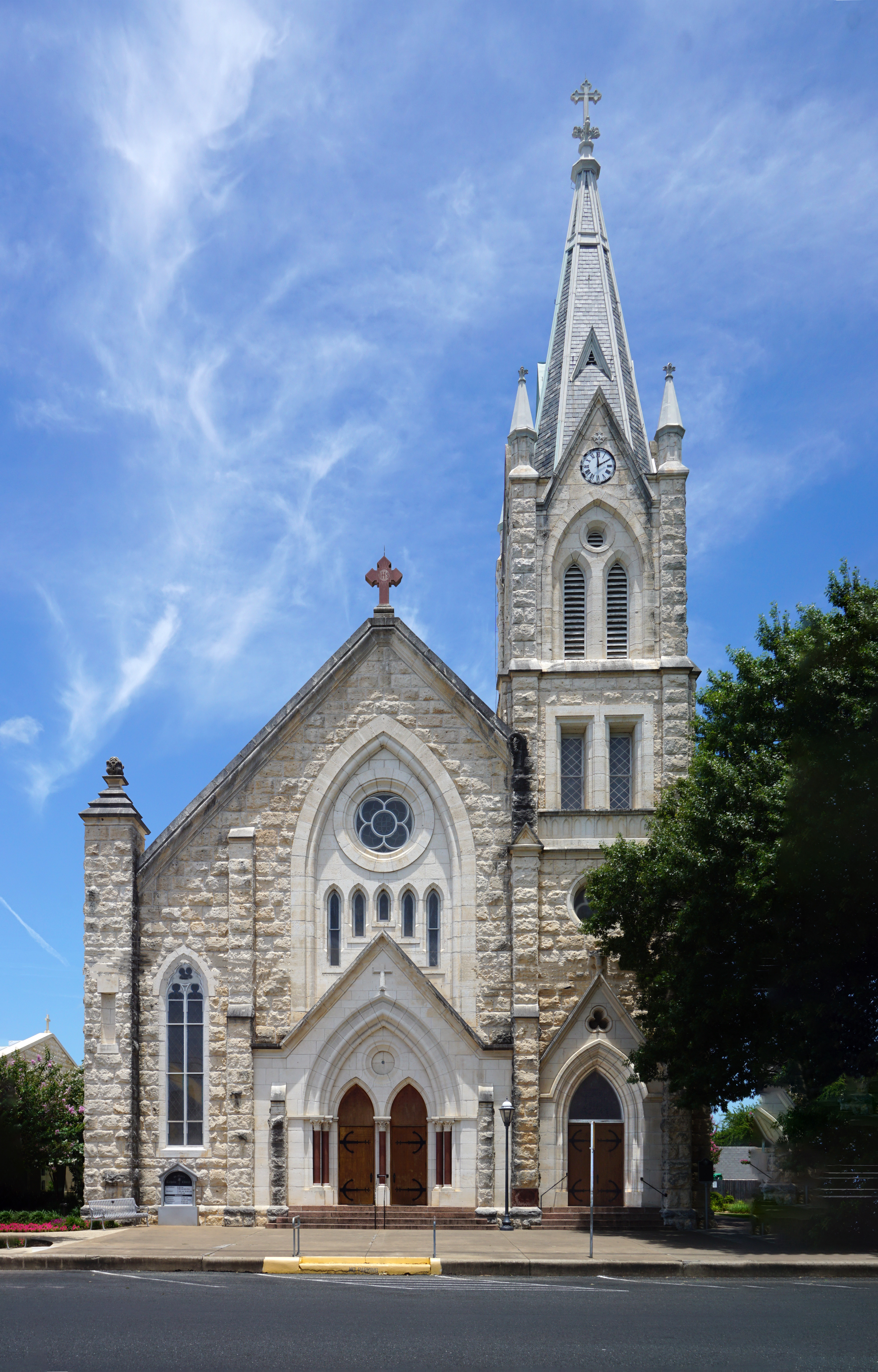
St. Mary's Catholic Church July 2017 2 (Main Church)

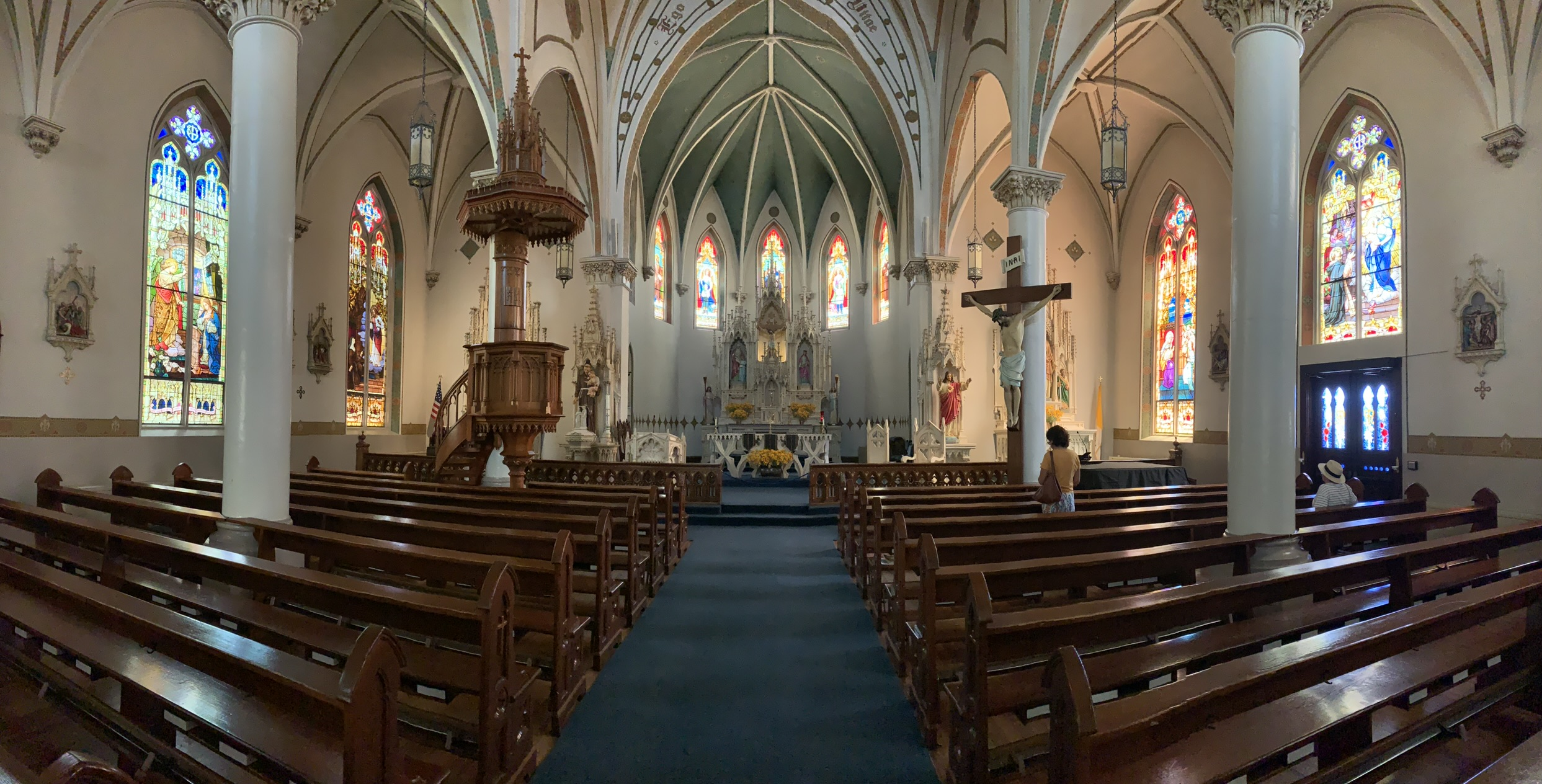
Interior of Saint Mary Catholic Church in Fredericksburg, Texas

== Railway ==
On January 3, 1913, the San Antonio, Fredericksburg and Northern Railway was chartered to connect Fredericksburg with the San Antonio and Aransas Pass Railway near Waring. In 1913 a 920-foot (280 m) long railroad tunnel was built. The cost of the tunnel sent the railroad into receivership on October 28, 1914. It was sold under foreclosure on December 31, 1917, to Martin Carle who deeded the property to the Fredericksburg and Northern Railway, which had been chartered on December 26 of that year. The train operated until July 27, 1942. Since the shutdown of the railway the tunnel has become a bat cave, hosting over 3 million Mexican free-tailed bats. In 2012 it became Old Tunnel State Park, which offers picnic and restroom facilities for visitors.

== Agritourism ==
The Fredericksburg-Stonewall area has become known as the Peach Capital of Texas and Benjamin Lester Enderle is known as the Father of the Hill Country Peach Industry. He was Gillespie County Surveyor and a math and science teacher at Fredericksburg High School when he planted five peach trees and began selling the fruit in 1921. Enderle worked to develop the Hale, Burbank, Elberta, and Stark varieties. He began marketing them through the H-E-B grocery chain, and eventually had 5,000 producing peach trees on 150 acres (61 ha). Growers claim the taste is due to the area having the right combination of elevation, sandy soil, and climate to produce flavorful clingstone and freestone peaches. The fruit ripens May–August, and consumers can either buy picked fruit, or pick their own.

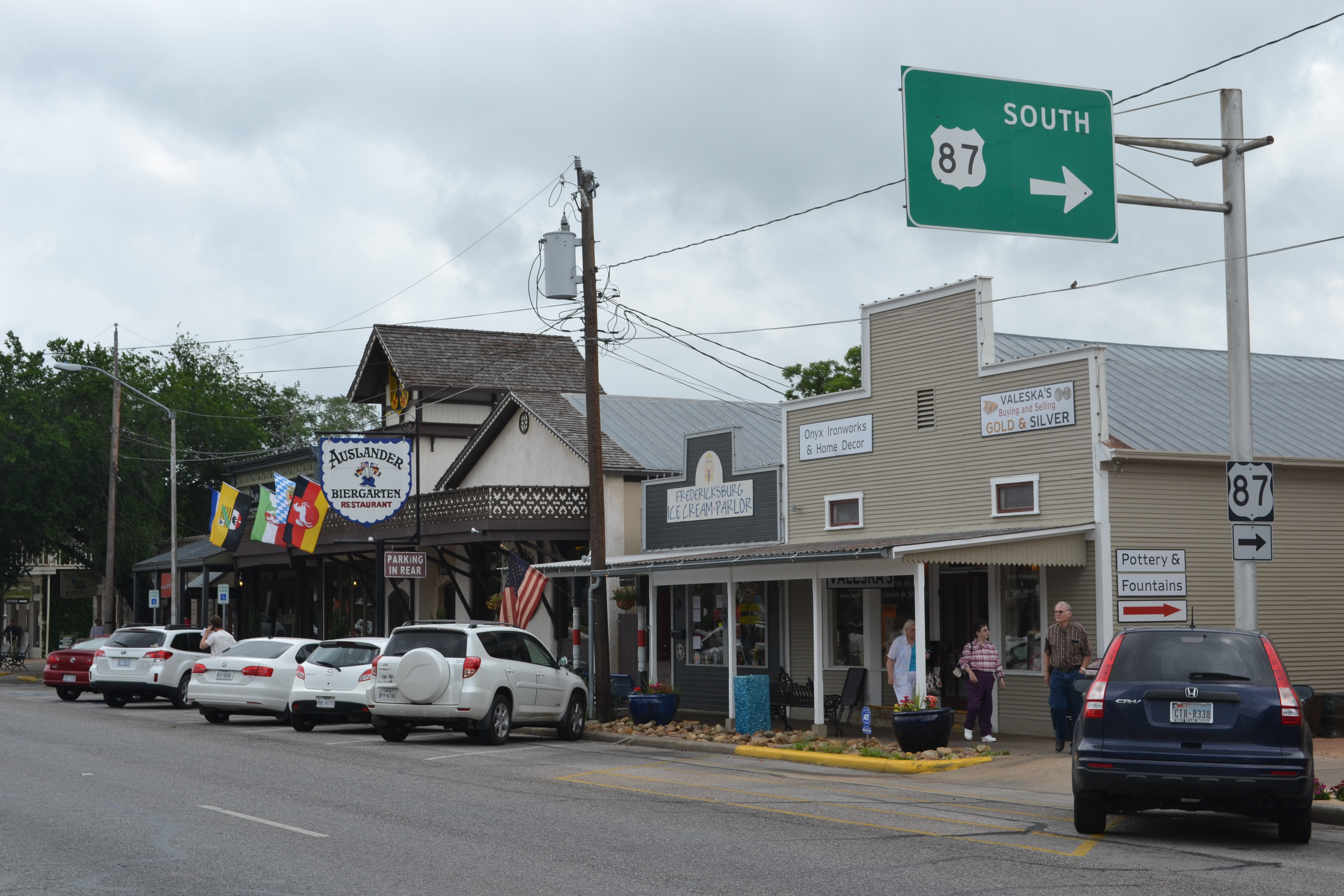
Main Street at Fredericksburg, a Biergarten is along the major street.

Herb farms, grape culture, lavender production, and wildflower seeds have become key businesses in Fredericksburg. Combinations of agriculture with day spas, wedding facilities, or bed-and-breakfast accommodations are not unusual. Even a Texas Hill Country Lavender Trail has been designated.

Lady Bird Johnson's passion for Texas wildflowers not only lives on in the Lady Bird Johnson Wildflower Center in Austin, but also sparked a high demand for seed. The 200-acre (81 ha) Wildseed Farms in Fredericksburg was founded by John R. Thomas in 1983 as a result of that high demand, and produces 88 varieties of wildflower seeds. It is the largest family-owned wildflower seed farm in the United States and host of an annual Wildflower Celebration.

In 1994, the Seventy-third Texas Legislature passed H.B. No. 1425, allowing brewpub operations within Texas. Fredericksburg Brewing Company began operations shortly thereafter. A number of vineyards and related industries have also arisen in the post-LBJ era of Fredericksburg. The designated American Viticultural Areas of Fredericksburg in the Texas Hill Country AVA and the much larger Texas Hill Country AVA both include Fredericksburg inside their boundaries. Fredericksburg is a common starting point or destination for tourists visiting wineries in the Texas Hill Country.

== Education ==
The city of Fredericksburg is served by the Fredericksburg Independent School District. The school's teams are called the "Battlin' Billies".

The first institute of higher learning in Fredericksburg was Fredericksburg College in 1876. The German Methodist Church of Fredericksburg founded the institution and offered courses in the arts, sciences, and foreign languages. Enrollment was about 150 students. W. J. R. Thoenssen was the first principal, succeeded by Charles F. Tansill. Finances caused the college to be closed in 1884. The property was sold to Fredericksburg Independent School District.

For higher education, Fredericksburg is home to Texas Tech University at Fredericksburg.

It also has some private schools, such as:

- Ambleside School of Fredericksburg
- Heritage School
- St. Mary's Elementary and Junior High School

Fredericksburg has a municipally operated library adjacent to the Gillespie County Courthouse.

=== Friends of Gillespie County Country Schools ===
Headquartered in Fredericksburg, the Friends of Gillespie County Country Schools is a group of former students and members of the community, interested in preserving the traditions of the old country schools, the community clubs, and the history of Gillespie County for future generations.

== Hospitals ==
Hill Country Memorial Hospital on Highway 16 is an acute-care facility that offers medical care, preventive care, and a wellness center.

== Transportation ==
=== Major roads ===
- U.S. Highway 87
- U.S. Route 290
- Texas State Highway 16
- Ranch to Market Road 1631
- Farm to Market Road 965

=== Airport ===
Gillespie County Airport (FAA locator T82) is located on State Highway 16 South, about 2 miles (3.2 km) from downtown Fredericksburg, and features a 5,002 ft (1,525 m) long runway and a hotel and diner. The airport was established by Hans Hannemann and Red Schroeder. Prior to 1945, the facility had been owned by the United States Army Air Corps. Transient and long-term hangar rentals are available.

== Demographics ==
Historical population
Census	Pop.	Note	%±
1850	754		—
1870	1,164		—
1880	1,085		−6.8%
1890	1,532		41.2%
1930	2,416		—
1940	3,544		46.7%
1950	3,854		8.7%
1960	4,629		20.1%
1970	5,326		15.1%
1980	6,412		20.4%
1990	6,934		8.1%
2000	8,911		28.5%
2010	10,530		18.2%
2020	10,875		3.3%
U.S. Decennial Census

=== 2020 census ===
As of the 2020 census, Fredericksburg had a population of 10,875. The median age was 50.8 years. 18.4% of residents were under the age of 18 and 32.2% of residents were 65 years of age or older.

For every 100 females there were 87.2 males, and for every 100 females age 18 and over there were 84.0 males age 18 and over.

97.7% of residents lived in urban areas, while 2.3% lived in rural areas.

There were 4,811 households in Fredericksburg, of which 23.6% had children under the age of 18 living in them. Of all households, 47.7% were married-couple households, 16.7% were households with a male householder and no spouse or partner present, and 31.1% were households with a female householder and no spouse or partner present. About 33.9% of all households were made up of individuals and 20.7% had someone living alone who was 65 years of age or older.

There were 5,886 housing units, of which 18.3% were vacant. The homeowner vacancy rate was 2.9% and the rental vacancy rate was 8.7%.

Racial composition as of the 2020 census
Race	Number	Percent
White	8,428	77.5%
Black or African American	61	0.6%
American Indian and Alaska Native	86	0.8%
Asian	102	0.9%
Native Hawaiian and Other Pacific Islander	0	0.0%
Some other race	623	5.7%
Two or more races	1,575	14.5%
Hispanic or Latino (of any race)	2,523	23.2%

=== 2023 census ===
As of the 2023 United States census, there were 11,254 people and 6,894 households. The population density was 1,177.7 people per square mile. The racial makeup of the city was 79% White, 0% African American, 0% Native American, 0% Asian, 1% from other races, and 1% from two or more races. Hispanic or Latino of any race were 19% of the population. 59% of households were occupied by their owners. 14% of the homes are worth between $200,000 to $299,999.

In the city, the population was spread out, with 19% under the age of 18, 56% from 18 to 69, and 25% who were 70 years of age or older. 53% of the population is female. The Median Age is 53.6 (35.5 in Texas). 9.8% of the population are veterans.

The median household income was $57,474. 10% of the population was below the poverty line, 8% under 18 years

=== 2000 census ===
As of the census of 2000, 8,911 people, 3,784 households, and 2,433 families resided in the city. The population density was 1,342 inhabitants per square mile (518/km^{2}). The 4,183 housing units averaged 630 per square mile (243.2/km^{2}). The racial makeup of the city was 93.08% White, 0.27% African American, 0.27% Native American, 0.19% Asian, 0.04% Pacific Islander, 5.09% from other races, and 1.05% from two or more races. Hispanics or Latinos of any race were 17.00% of the population. English is spoken by 72.73% of the population, Spanish by 14.77%, and Texas German by 12.48%. In terms of ancestry, 39.7% were of German, 12.5% were of Irish, 10.8% were of English, 4.9% were of American, 3.2% were of Scotch-Irish, 2.3% were of Scottish, 2.3% were of Dutch.

Of the 3,784 households, 23.9% had children under the age of 18 living with them, 53.2% were married couples living together, 8.5% had a female householder with no husband present, and 35.7% were not families. About 32.4% of all households were made up of individuals, and 19.6% had someone living alone who was 65 years of age or older. The average household size was 2.24 and the average family size was 2.82.

In the city, the population was distributed as 20.3% under the age of 18, 6.0% from 18 to 24, 20.8% from 25 to 44, 22.6% from 45 to 64, and 30.3% who were 65 years of age or older. The median age was 47 years. For every 100 females, there were 81.4 males. For every 100 females age 18 and over, there were 78.2 males.

The median income for a household in the city was $32,276, and for a family was $43,670. Males had a median income of $25,878 versus $22,171 for females. The per capita income for the city was $18,788. About 7.5% of families and 11.9% of the population were below the poverty line, including 16.1% of those under age 18 and 11.5% of those age 65 or over.

== Government ==
The city of Fredericksburg is run under the council-manager form of government. As per the Home Rule Charter adopted May 1991, the governing body of Fredericksburg consists of a mayor and four council members. Both the mayor and the council are elected in alternating years by the city at large for two-year terms with a limit of four consecutive terms.

== Media ==
=== Radio ===
AM Radio station KNAF went on the air in 1947. The original license was granted by the Federal Communications Commission to Arthur Stehling. The license was transferred to Norbert Fritz and family.

=== Newspapers ===
The Fredericksburg Standard was originally titled Gillespie County News and was founded in 1888. The name change happened in 1907. The paper was purchased by the Fredericksburg Publishing Company in 1915, which also published the German language newspaper Fredericksburg Wochenblatt. The Radio Post began publishing in 1922 and was purchased in 1984 by the Fredericksburg Publishing Company. The two newspapers merged into the Fredericksburg Standard-Radio Post.

== In popular culture ==
- Film:
  - Baghdad Texas (2009) filmed in Fredericksburg and Kerrville, Texas
  - Seven Days in Utopia (2011) filmed at the Boot Ranch golf club just north of Fredericksburg, as well as in Utopia, Texas, and featuring Academy Award-winner Robert Duvall and Lucas Black. It was based on the book Golf's Sacred Journey: Seven Days at the Links of Utopia, Grand Rapids: Zondervan, 2009. ISBN 978-0-310-31885-9.
- Music:
  - "Stoned" (1995) a song by Old 97's advises 'Take a Greyhound to Fredericksburg'
  - "Chester Nimitz Oriental Garden Waltz" (1988) a song by the Austin Lounge Lizards
  - Grammy-winning blues artist Johnny Nicholas runs the Hill Top Cafe on US87 near Fredericksburg in a 1930s former gas station
- Books:
  - Early 1932 saw author Robert E. Howard taking one of his frequent trips around Texas. He traveled through the southern part of the state with his main occupation being, in his own words, "the wholesale consumption of tortillas, enchiladas and cheap Spanish wine." In Fredericksburg, while overlooking sullen hills through a misty rain, he conceived of the prehistoric fantasy land of Cimmeria, the bitter hard northern region home to fearsome barbarians. In February, while in Mission, he wrote the poem Cimmeria. It was also during this trip that Howard first conceived of the character of Conan the Barbarian.
  - Gurasich, Mari (1994). A House Divided. Texas Christian University Press. ISBN 978-0-87565-122-4. During the Civil War, young Louisa is the youngest daughter in a German household in Fredericksburg. One brother has been killed by Confederate vigilantes James P. Waldrip and Die Haengebande, and the other brother is in a Union prison.
  - Gimenez, Mark (2009). The Perk. Sphere. ISBN 978-0-7515-3967-7. Lawyer Beck Hardin returns to his hometown of Fredericksburg after the death of his wife, helping to solve an old crime.
- Comedy:
  - Bill Hicks referenced Fredericksburg in the bit "Gifts of Forgiveness" which was included on his 1997 posthumously released comedy album Rant In E-Minor
- Radio:
  - Walter de Paduwa on his Dr Boogie radio show of 11/11/2016 described (in French) his 1990s visit to Fredericksburg eating sauerkraut at 35 degrees, and seeing the Nimitz statue but summing up with the somewhat sweeping advice N'allez jamais a Fredericksburg. Il n'y a RIEN a voir a Frederiksburg (Never go to Fredericksburg. There is NOTHING to see at Fredericksburg).

== Notable people ==
Notable people of Fredericksburg, Texas
Name	Birth-death	Notability	Ref(s)
Jacob Bickler	(1849–1902)	Educator, founder of two Austin academies, taught summer school in Fredericksburg	
Kyle Biedermann	(born 1959)	Texas state legislator	
Sidney Dearing	(1870–1953)	Businessperson in California, subjected to racism and hate crimes in the 1920s	
Matthew Gaines	(1840–1900)	Former slave, Baptist minister that became a senator in the Texas State Legislature after emancipation	
General Michael W. Hagee	(born 1944)	33rd Commandant of the United States Marine Corps	
Max Hirsch	(1880–1969)	National Museum of Racing and Hall of Fame thoroughbred horse trainer	
Betty Holekamp	(1826–1902)	German colonist and pioneer woman, called the Betsy Ross of Texas	
1st Lt. Louis John Jordan	(1890–1918)	All-American football player with Texas Longhorns (1911–1914), first Texan officer killed in World War I, posthumously awarded the Croix de Guerre in 1924	
Hugo Emil Klaerner	(1908–1982)	Chicago White Sox pitcher	
Allen V. Kneese	(1930–2001)	Pioneer of environmental economics	
Engelbert Krauskopf	(1820–1881)	Gunsmith, inventor, naturalist	
Jacob Kuechler	(1823–1893)	Surveyor, conscientious objector during the Civil War, and commissioner of the Texas General Land Office	
Lara Logan	(born 1971)	60 Minutes Correspondent	
Hermann Lungkwitz	(1813–1891)	Landscape artist and photographer, noted for first pictorial records of the Texas Hill Country	
John O. Meusebach	(1812–1897)	Founding father of Fredericksburg	
Henry Miller	(1853–1896)	First Grand President of the International Brotherhood of Electrical Workers (IBEW)	
William Molter	(1910–1960)	Thoroughbred trainer in National Museum of Racing and Hall of Fame	
Charles Henry Nimitz	(1826–1911)	Built the Nimitz Hotel in 1852, grandfather of Fleet Admiral Chester Nimitz, elected to the Texas Legislature in 1890	
Fleet Admiral Chester Nimitz	(1885–1966)	Commander-in-Chief of the U.S. Pacific Forces in World War II	
Friedrich Richard Petri	(1824–1857)	Painter who depicted relationships between early German settlers and local Native American tribes	
Colonel Alfred P. C. Petsch	(1887–1981)	Lawyer, legislator, civic leader, and philanthropist, served in the Texas House of Representatives 1925–1941, veteran of both World War I and World War II	
Felix Stehling	(1925–2012)	Co-founder of Taco Cabana	
Buffy Tyler	(born 1978)	Playboy Playmate November 2000	
Frank Van der Stucken	(1858–1929)	Music composer, conductor	

== Gallery ==
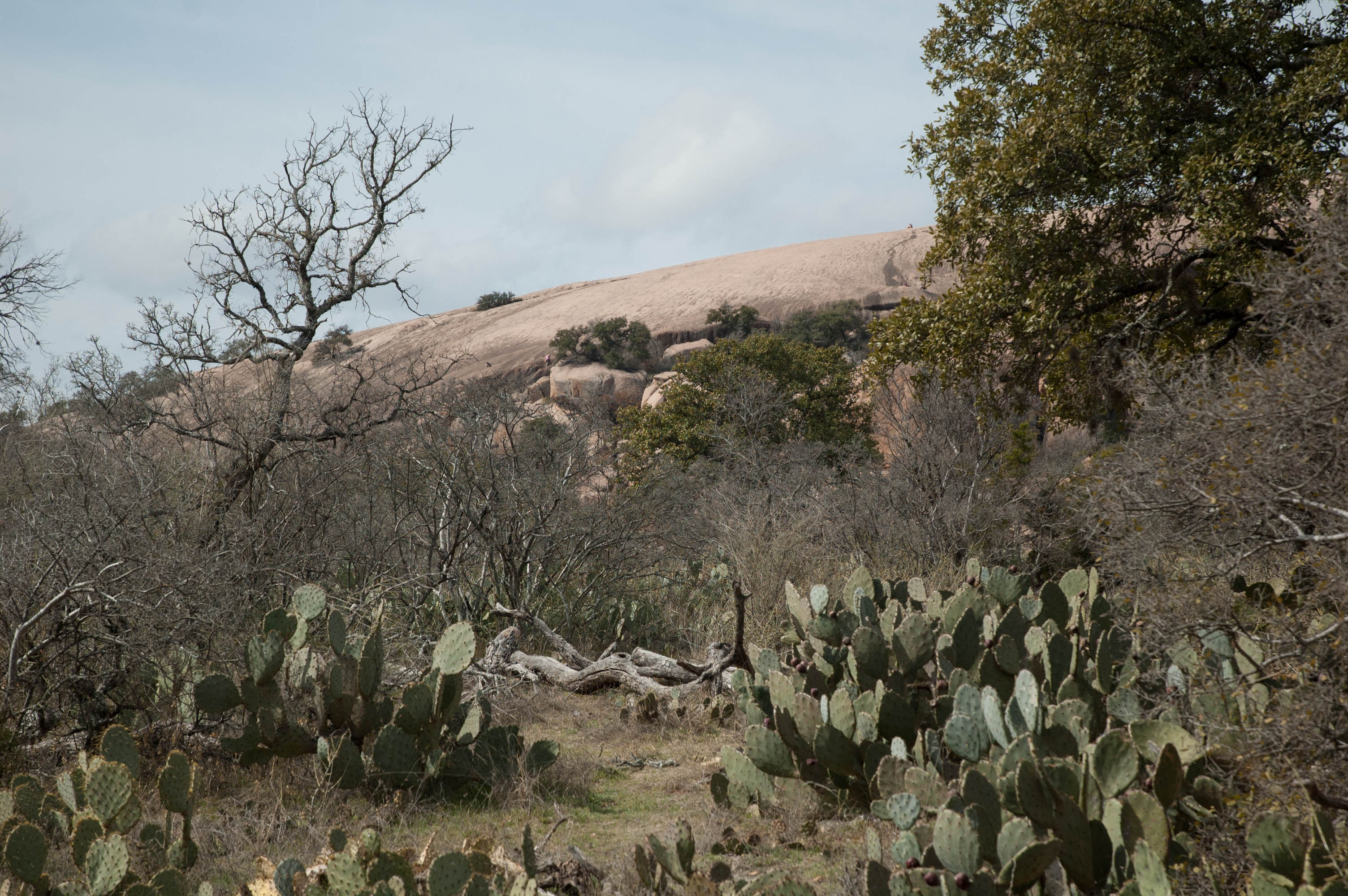
View of Enchanted Rock from base camp

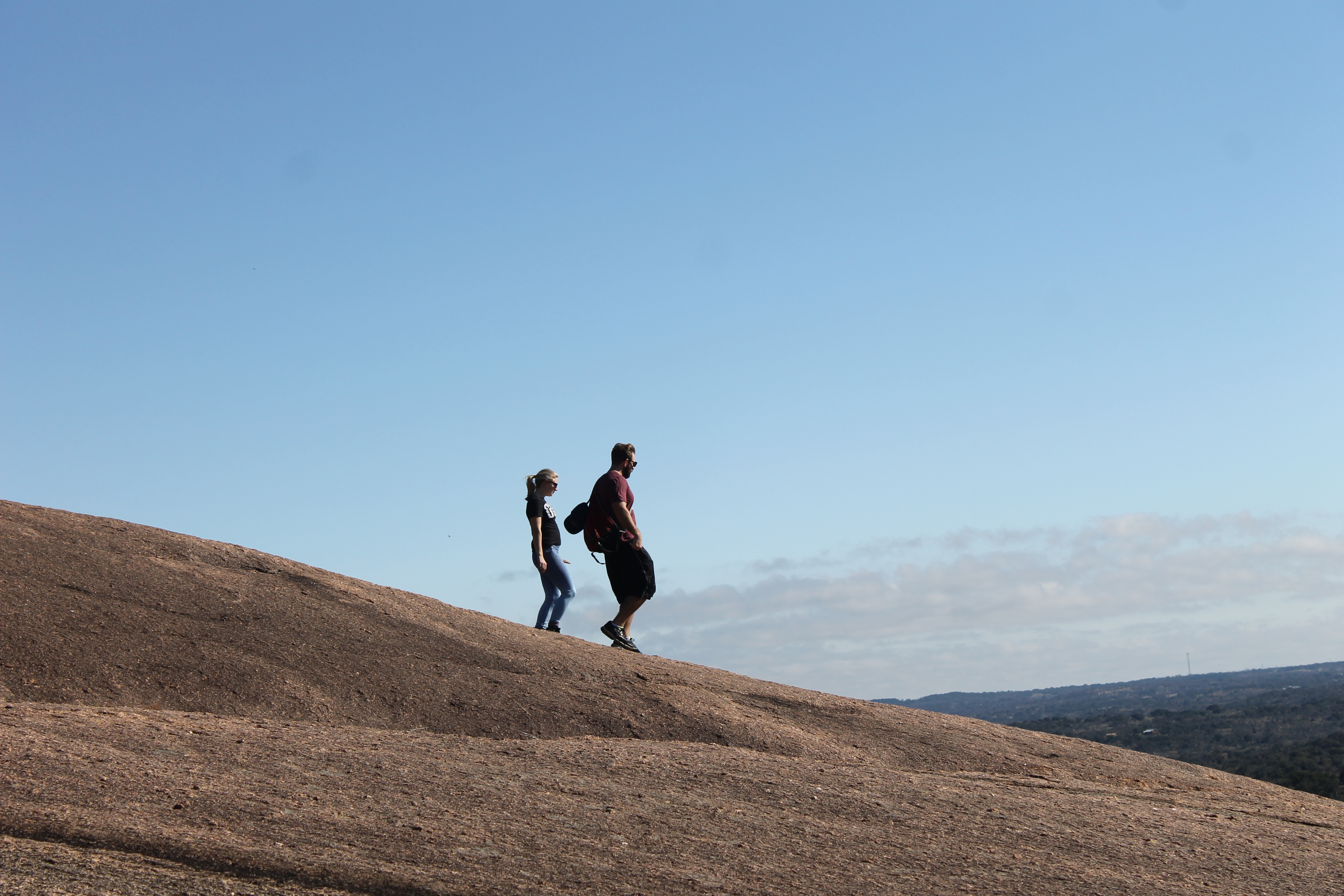
Couple strolling down Enchanted rock

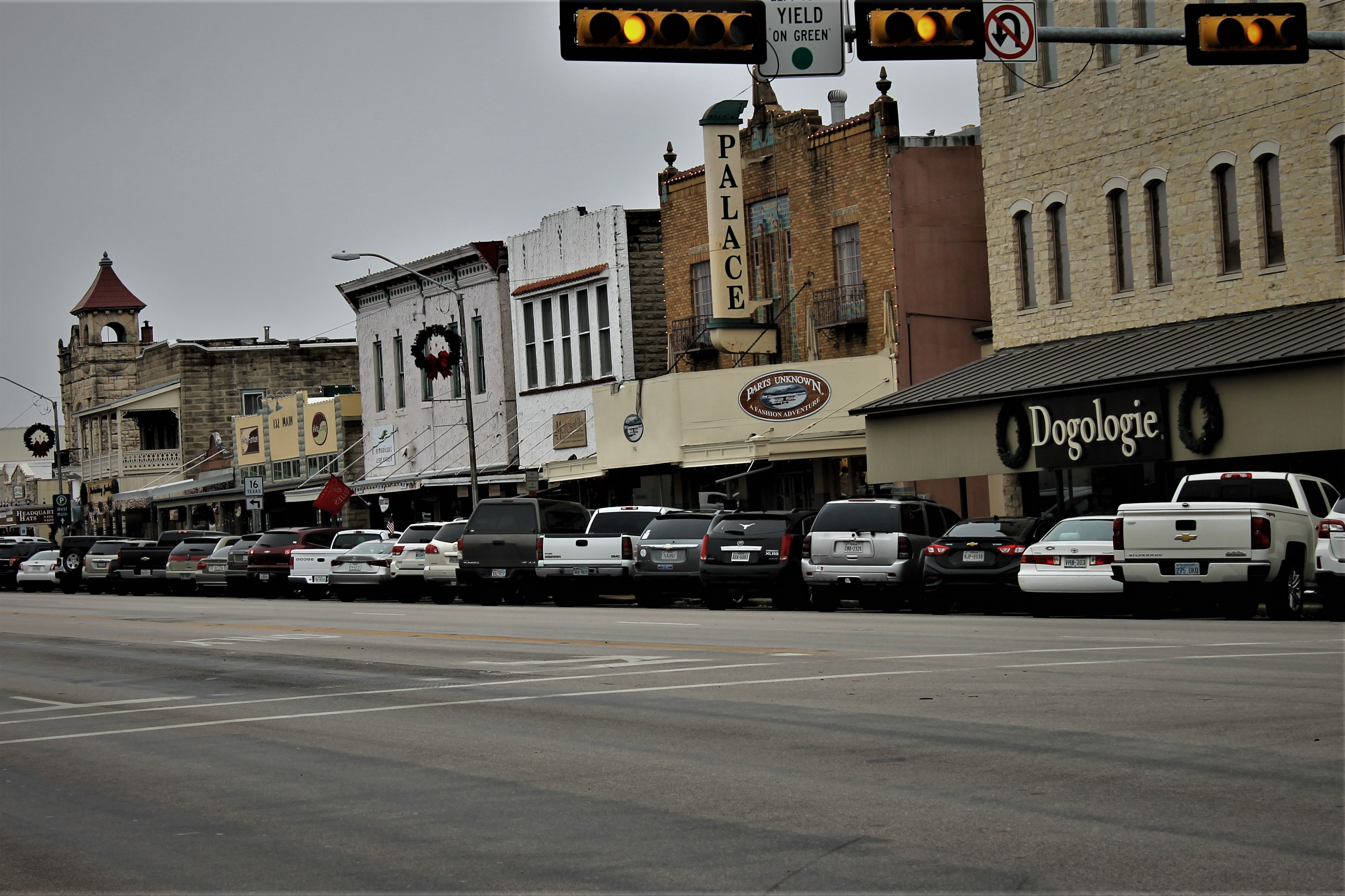
Fredericksburg is known for its many downtown shops.

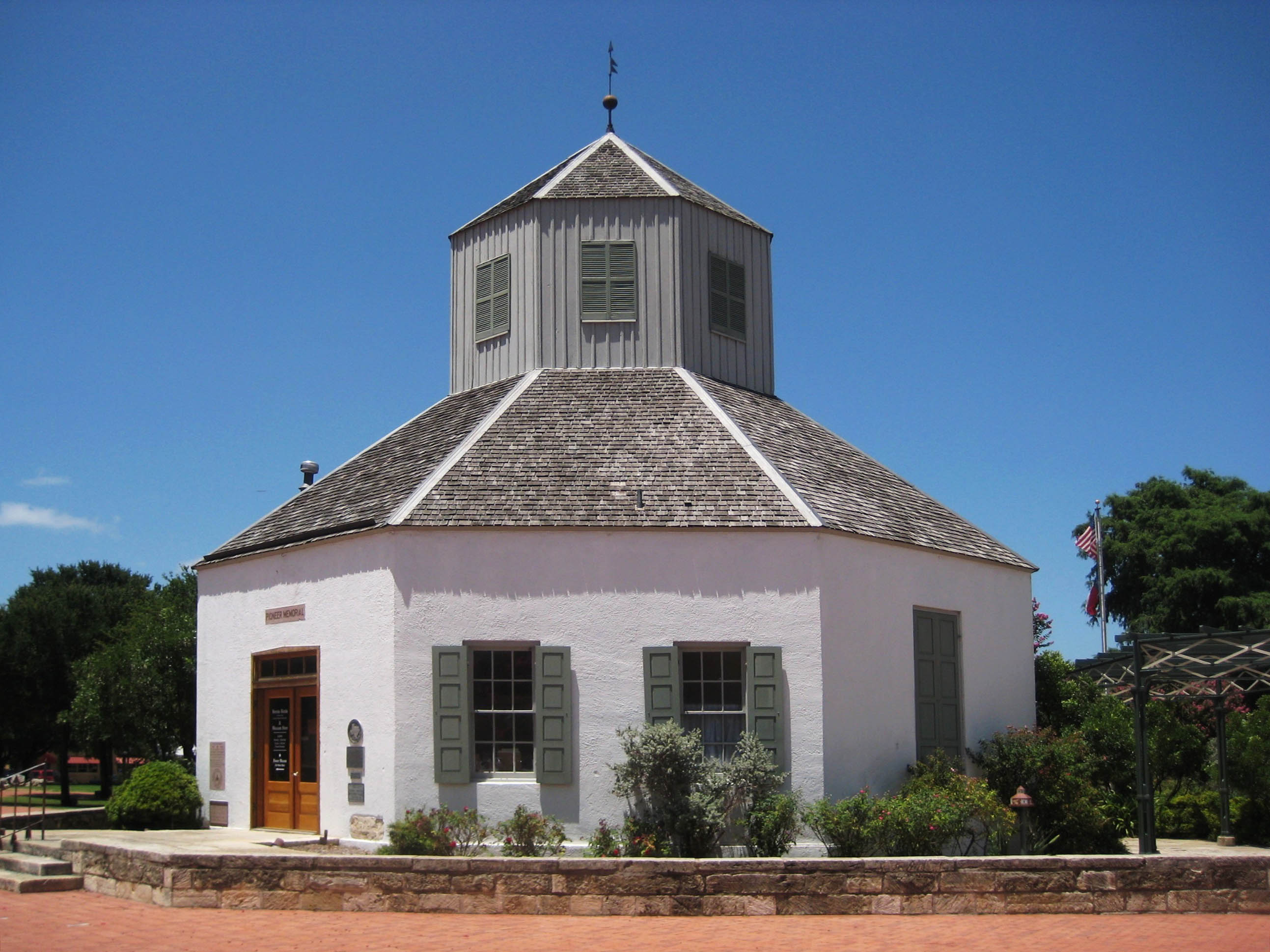
The Vereins-Kirche, c. 1847

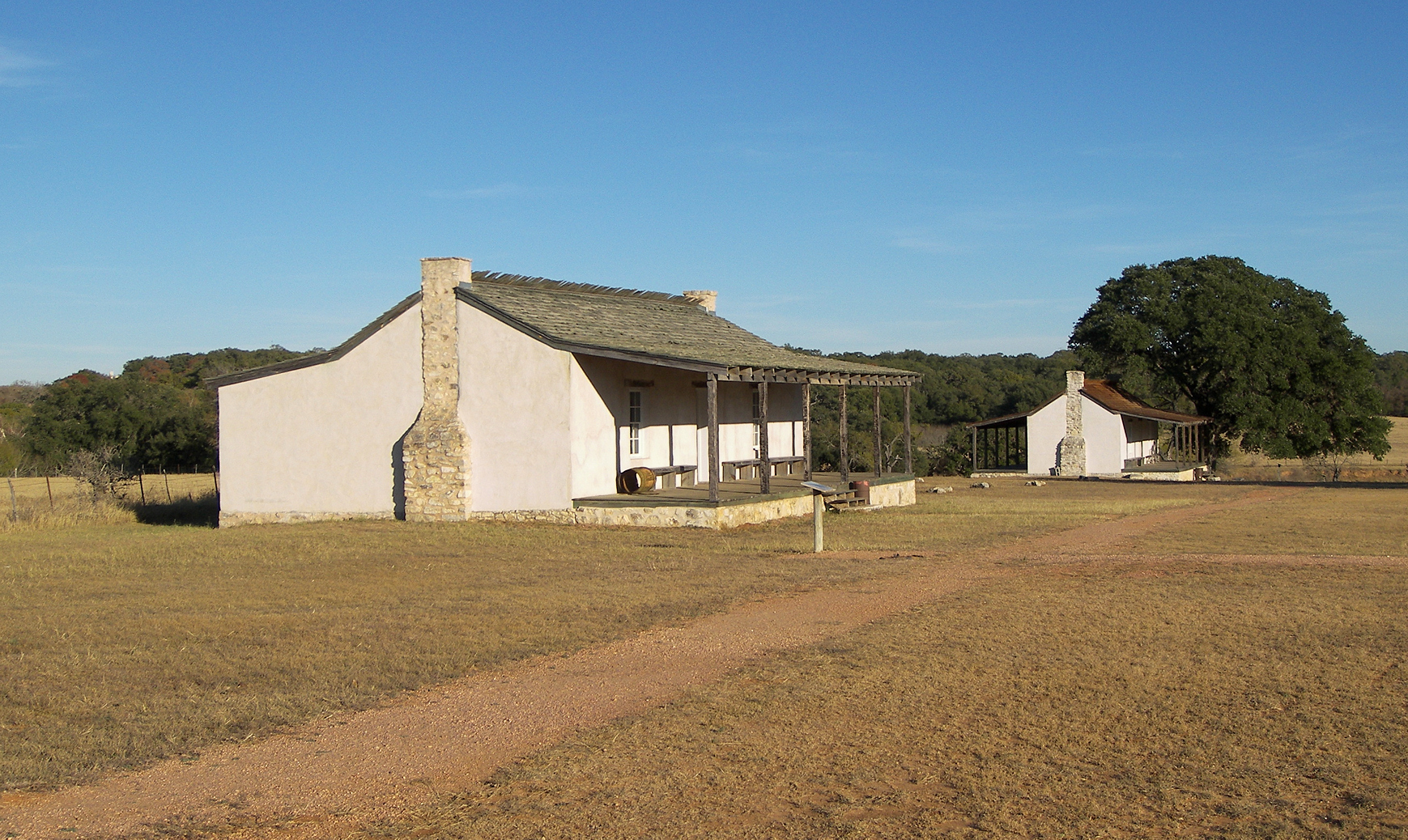
Fort Martin Scott, c. 1848

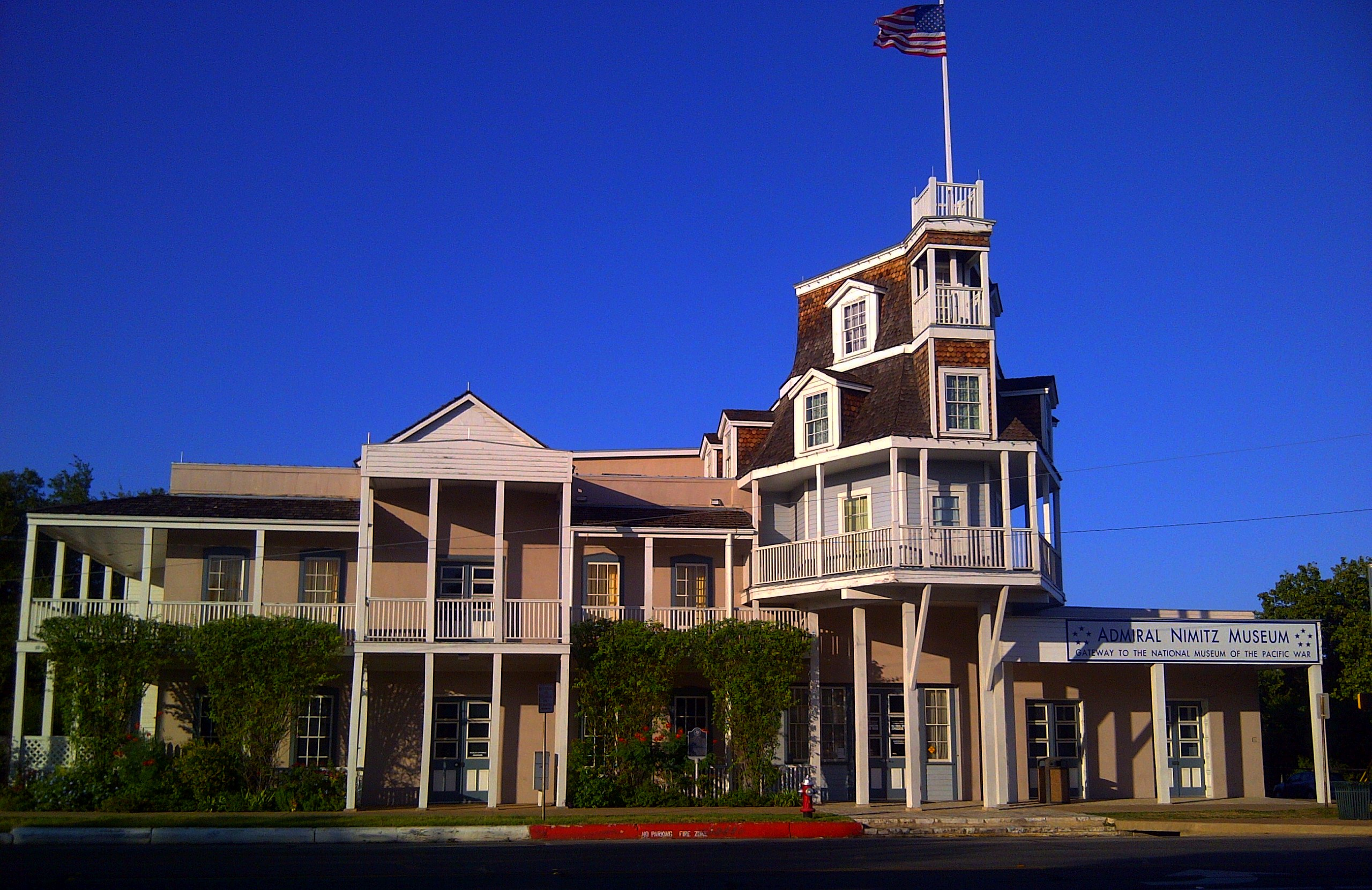
Admiral Nimitz Museum, c. 1852

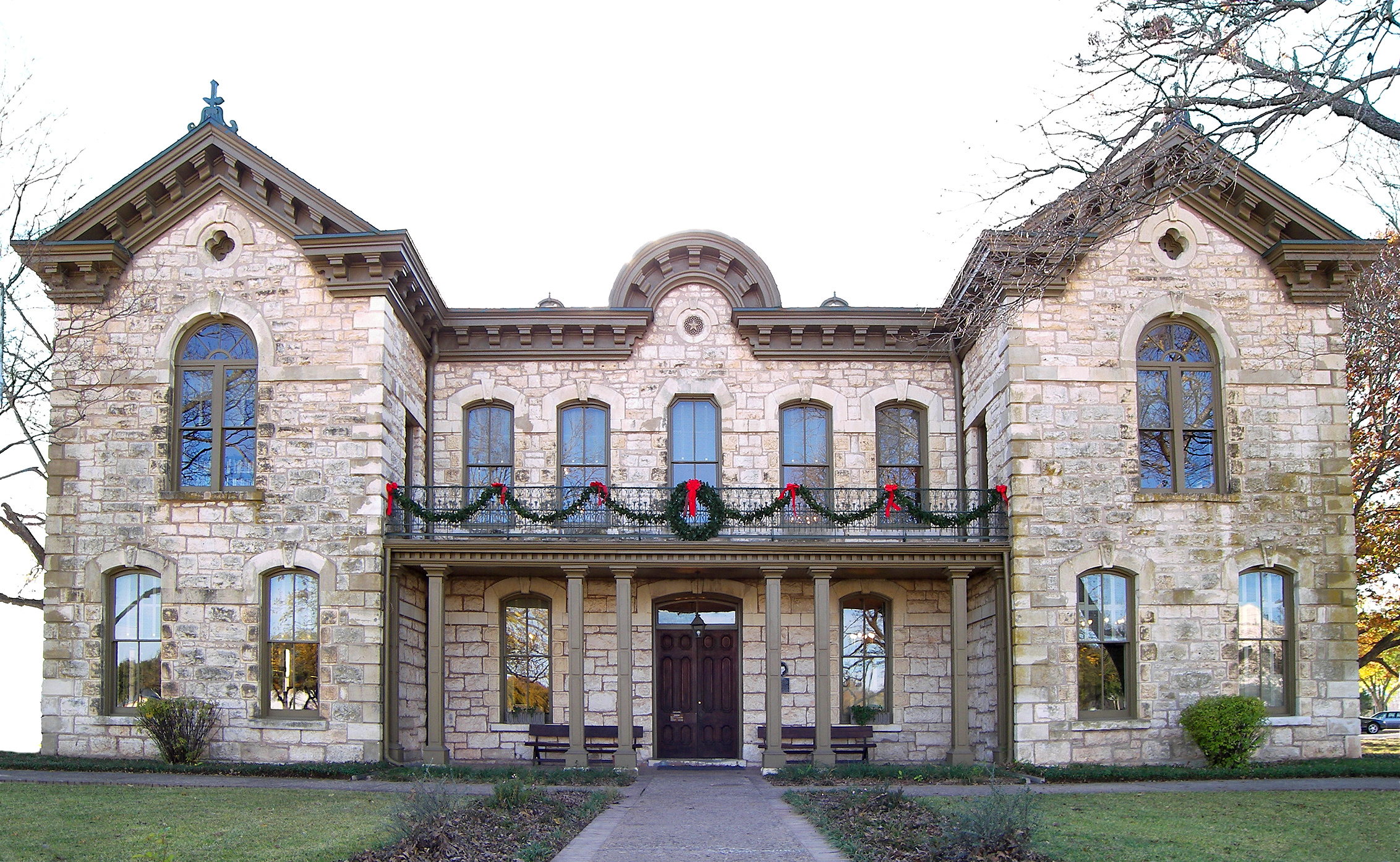
Pioneer Memorial Library (Gillespie County Courthouse), c. 1882

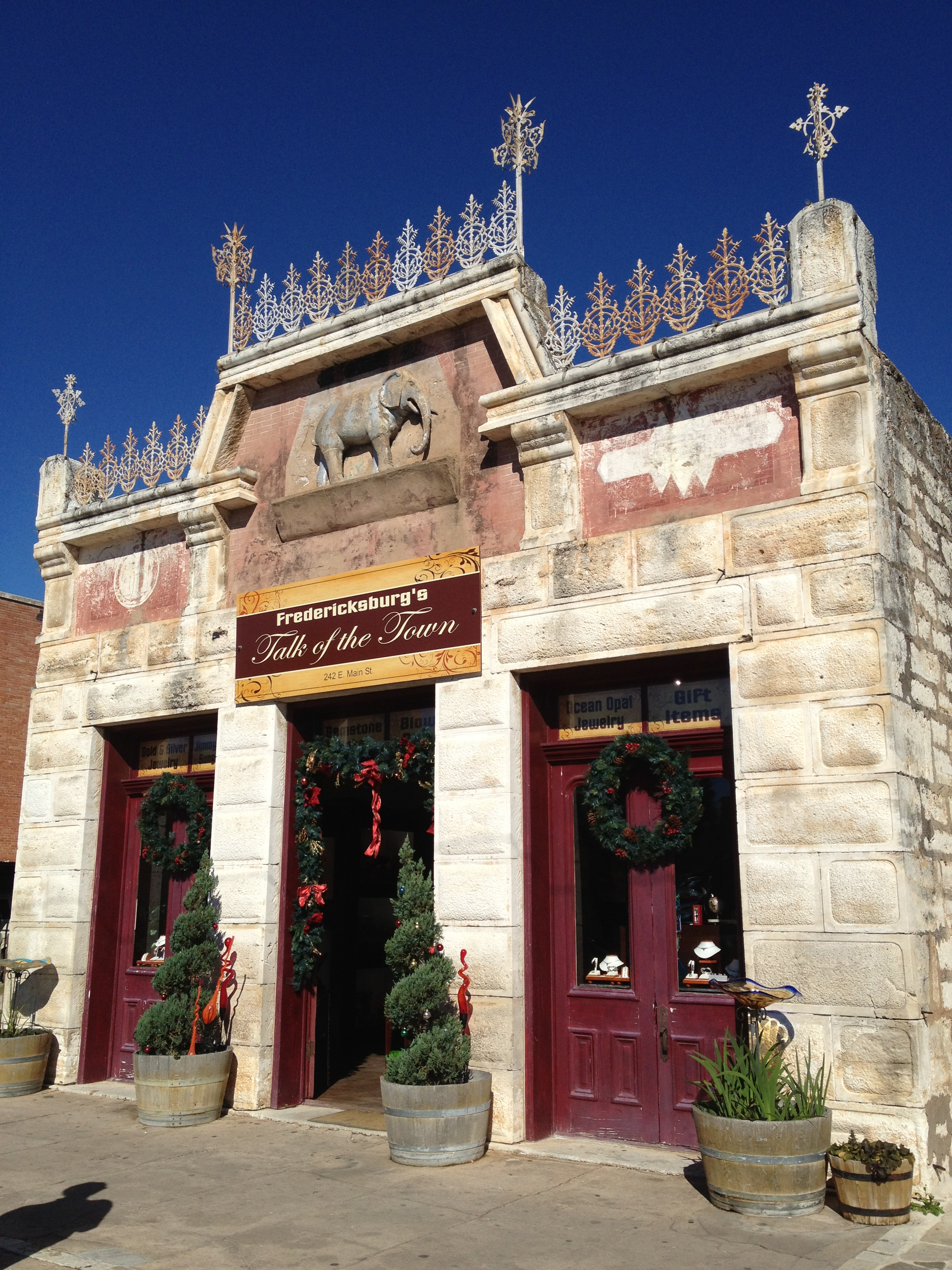
White Elephant Saloon, c. 1888

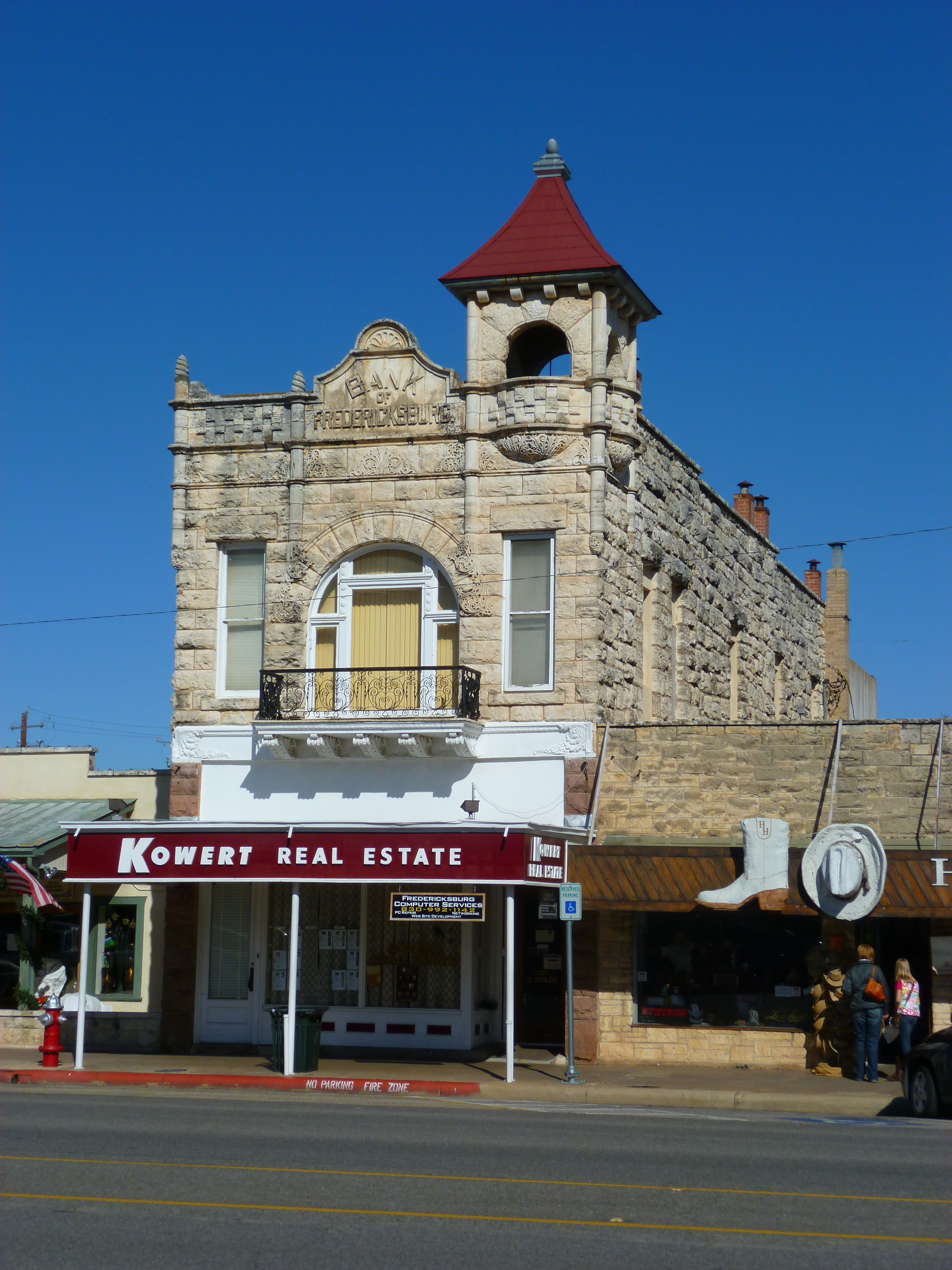
Bank of Fredericksburg, c. 1889

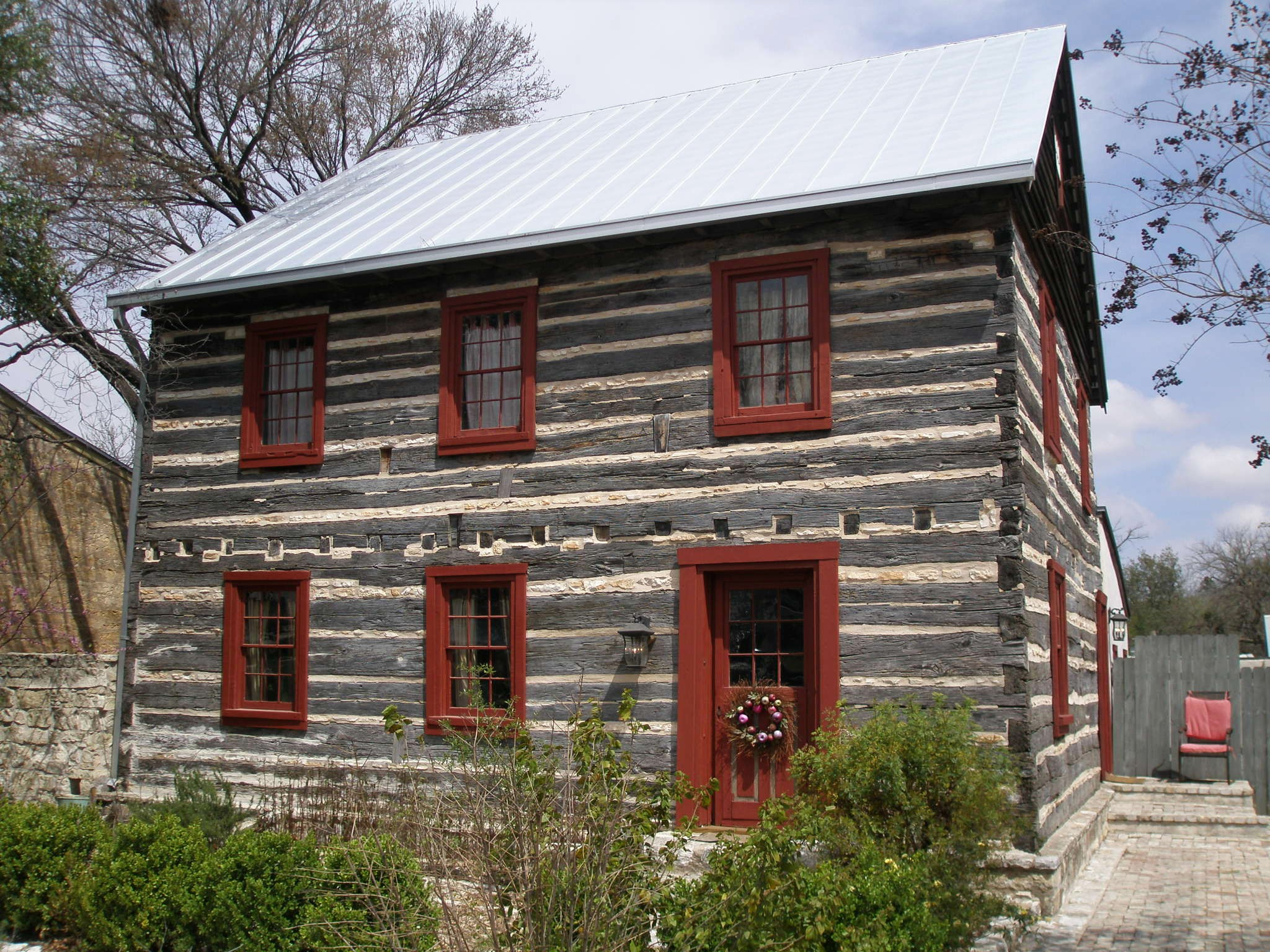
Haussegen Platz Log Haus bed and breakfast

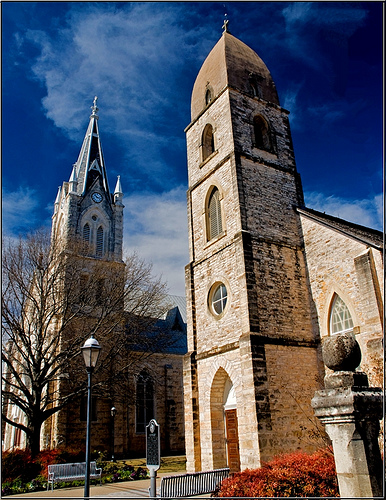
St. Marys Catholic Church, c. 1906

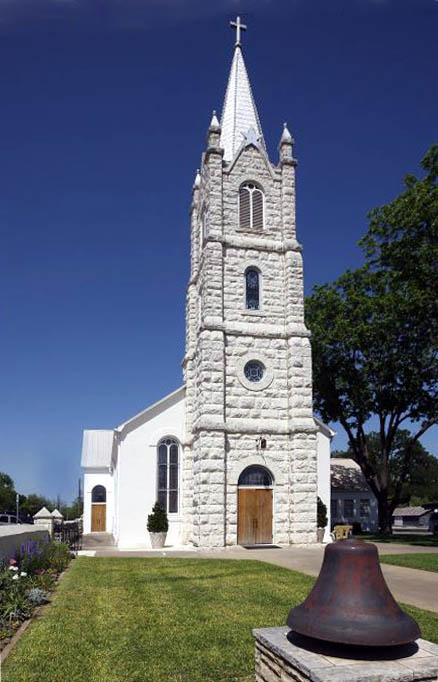
Zion Lutheran Church, c. 1854 (oldest Lutheran Church in the Texas Hill Country)

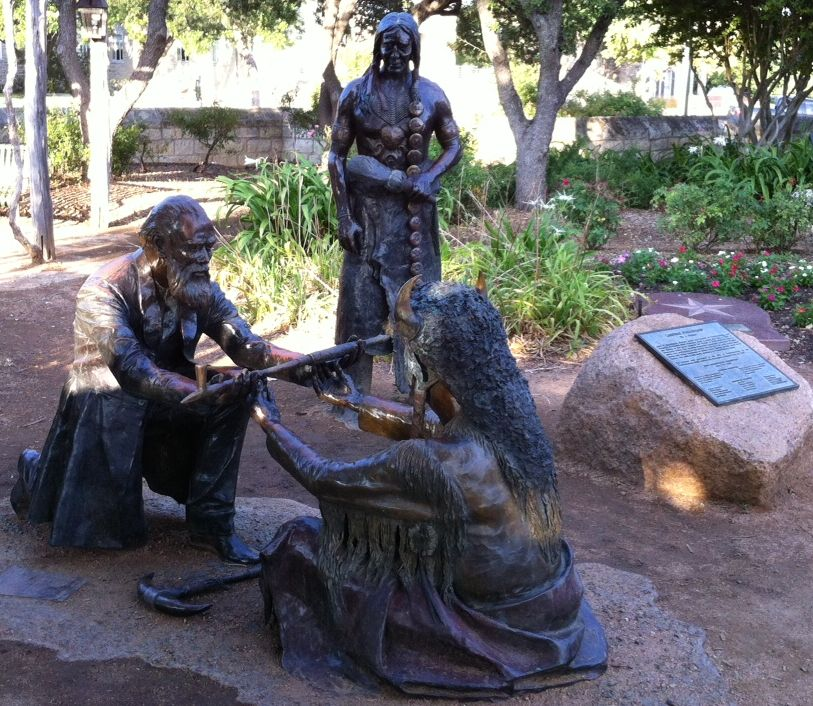
Bronze statue "Lasting Friendship" in Fredericksburg park commemorating the peace treaty between local settlers and the Comanche.

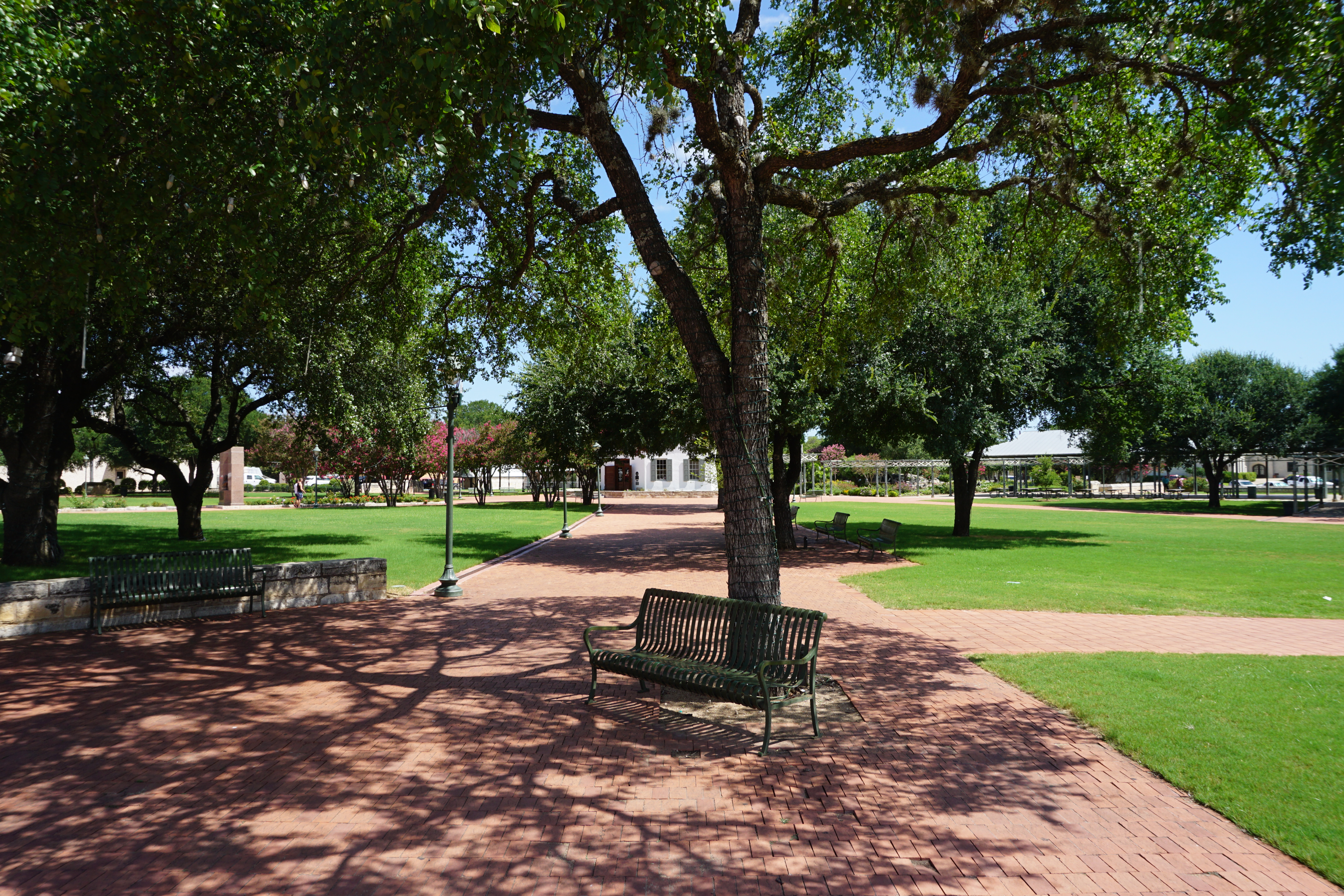
Marktplatz

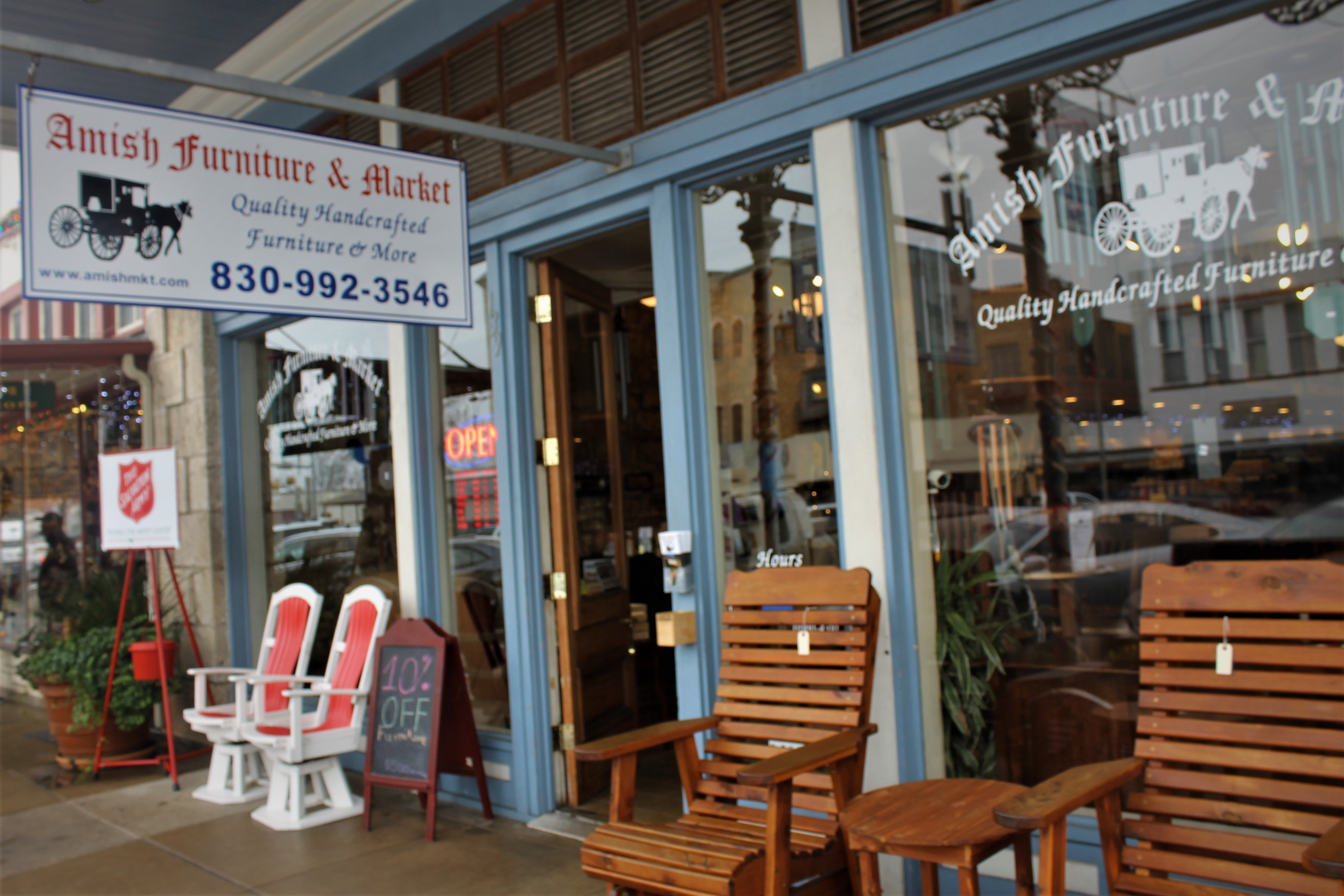
Amish Furniture and Market in Fredericksburg

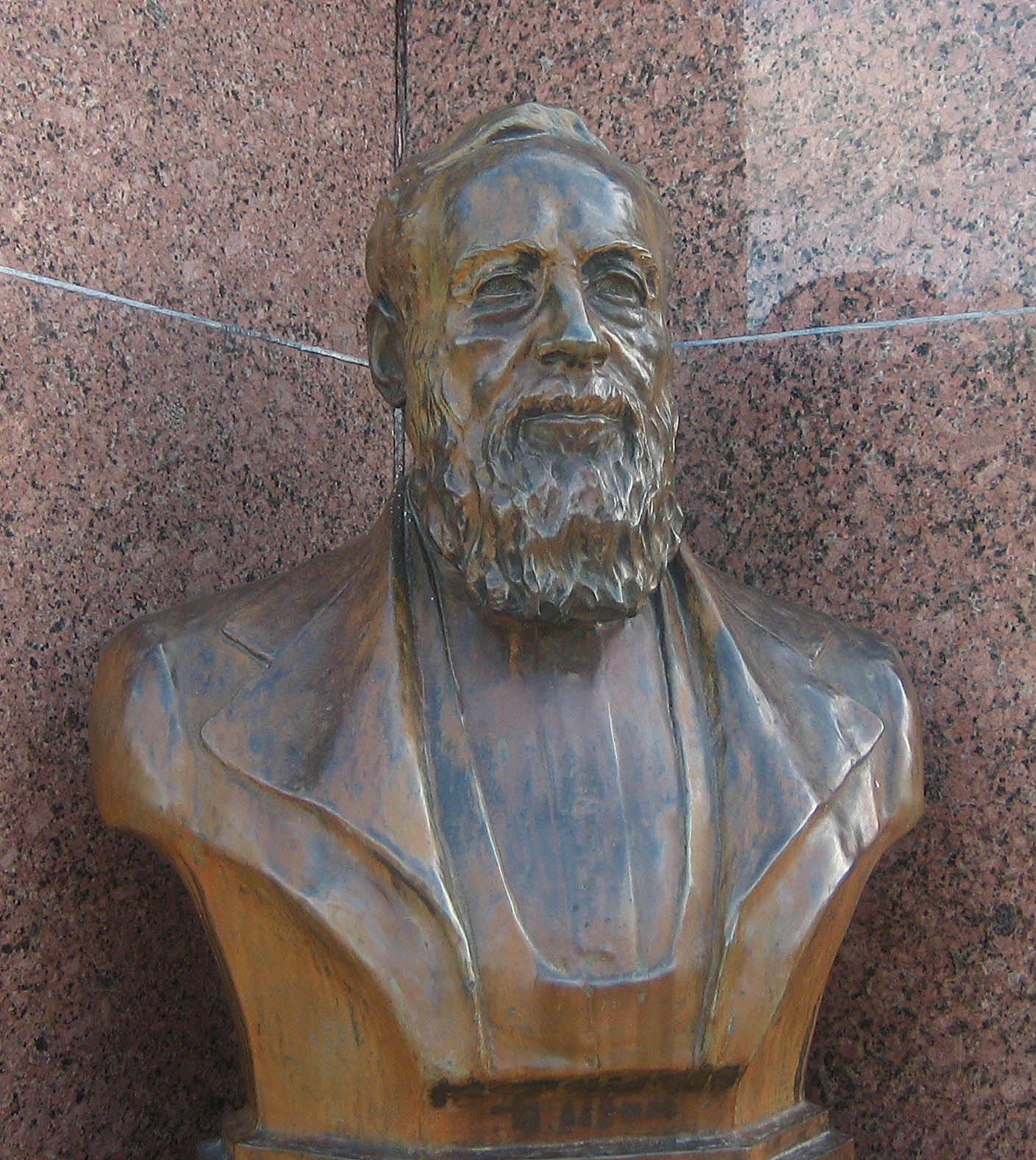
John O. Meusebach who led the German settlers to Fredericksburg

== See also ==
- Fredericksburg Theater Company
- Fredericksburg in the Texas Hill Country AVA
- Adelsverein
- Central Texas Electric Cooperative
- Cherry Springs Dance Hall
- Easter Fire
- German Texan
- Loyal Valley
- Meusebach Homesite
- List of museums in Central Texas
- Sisterdale, Texas
- Texas Hill Country
- Wrede School
