= Brinkman House =

Brinkman House may refer to:

- The former Sherman House Hotel, Chicago, Illinois, demolished in 1973. It was known originally as Brinkman House.
- Otto Brinkmann House, Comfort, Texas, NRHP-listed
- Richardson-Brinkman Cobblestone House, Clinton, Wisconsin, NRHP-listed
