= Herf =

Herf could refer to:

- High-Energy Radio Frequency weapons
- Herf (surname), German-Jewish surname
- Limburgish for Herve, city in the province of Liège, Wallonia, Belgium

== See also ==
- Herff, middle name and surname
