= National Register of Historic Places listings in Kendall County, Texas =

Location of Kendall County in Texas

This is a list of the National Register of Historic Places listings in Kendall County, Texas.

This is intended to be a complete list of the properties and districts on the National Register of Historic Places in Kendall County, Texas. There are three districts and eight individual properties listed on the National Register in the county. One district includes two individual properties and contains several State Antiquities Landmarks and Recorded Texas Historic Landmarks. Outside of the district, three other properties are Recorded Texas Historic Landmarks.

This National Park Service list is complete through NPS recent listings posted March 21, 2025.

== Current listings ==
The locations of National Register properties and districts may be seen in a mapping service provided.

	Name on the Register	Image	Date listed	Location	City or town	Description
1	Otto Brinkmann House	Otto Brinkmann House	December 12, 1977 (#77001457)	602 High St. 29°58′04″N 98°54′32″W	Comfort	Part of Comfort Historic District; Recorded Texas Historic Landmark
2	Comfort Historic District	Comfort Historic District	May 29, 1979 (#79002989)	State Highway 27; also roughly bounded by State Highway 27, Lindner Ave., Cypress Creek, 1st St., and Front St., 29°58′03″N 98°54′40″W	Comfort	Specific boundaries represent a boundary increase of August 25, 2004; contains State Antiquities Landmarks, Recorded Texas Historic Landmarks
3	Joseph Dienger Building	Joseph Dienger Building	January 19, 1984 (#84001901)	106 W. Blanco Rd. 29°47′40″N 98°43′55″W	Boerne	Recorded Texas Historic Landmark
4	Gazebo for Albert Steves	Gazebo for Albert Steves	December 23, 2004 (#04001171)	105 FM 473, at east portion of property 29°58′12″N 98°53′10″W	Comfort	Gazebo at Haven River Inn; Sculpture by Dionicio Rodriguez
5	Herff-Rozelle Farm	Herff-Rozelle Farm	December 3, 2009 (#09000983)	33 Herff Rd. 29°46′51″N 98°42′53″W	Boerne	
6	Hygieostatic Bat Roost	Hygieostatic Bat Roost	March 28, 1983 (#83003144)	FM 473 E of Comfort; 29°58′13″N 98°53′05″W	Comfort	Recorded Texas Historic Landmark
7	Kendall County Courthouse and Jail	Kendall County Courthouse and Jail	February 15, 1980 (#80004138)	Public Sq. 29°47′40″N 98°43′50″W	Boerne	State Antiquities Landmark, Recorded Texas Historic Landmark
8	Kendall Inn	Kendall Inn	June 29, 1976 (#76002045)	128 W Blanco Rd; 29°47′38″N 98°44′00″W	Boerne	Recorded Texas Historic Landmark
9	Sisterdale Valley District	Sisterdale Valley District	January 8, 1975 (#75001996)	SR 1376; 29°58′34″N 98°42′56″W	Sisterdale	
10	Treue der Union Monument	Treue der Union Monument	November 29, 1978 (#78002966)	High St. between Third and Fourth; 29°58′10″N 98°54′49″W	Comfort	Part of Comfort Historic District; State Antiquities Landmark
11	Voelcker-Sueltenfuss House		October 10, 2017 (#100001722)	82 Swede Springs Rd. 29°52′19″N 98°34′49″W	Boerne	

== See also ==
- National Register of Historic Places listings in Texas
- Recorded Texas Historic Landmarks in Kendall County
