= Treue der Union Monument =

- U.S. National Register of Historic Places
- U.S. Historic district – Contributing property
- Texas State Antiquities Landmark
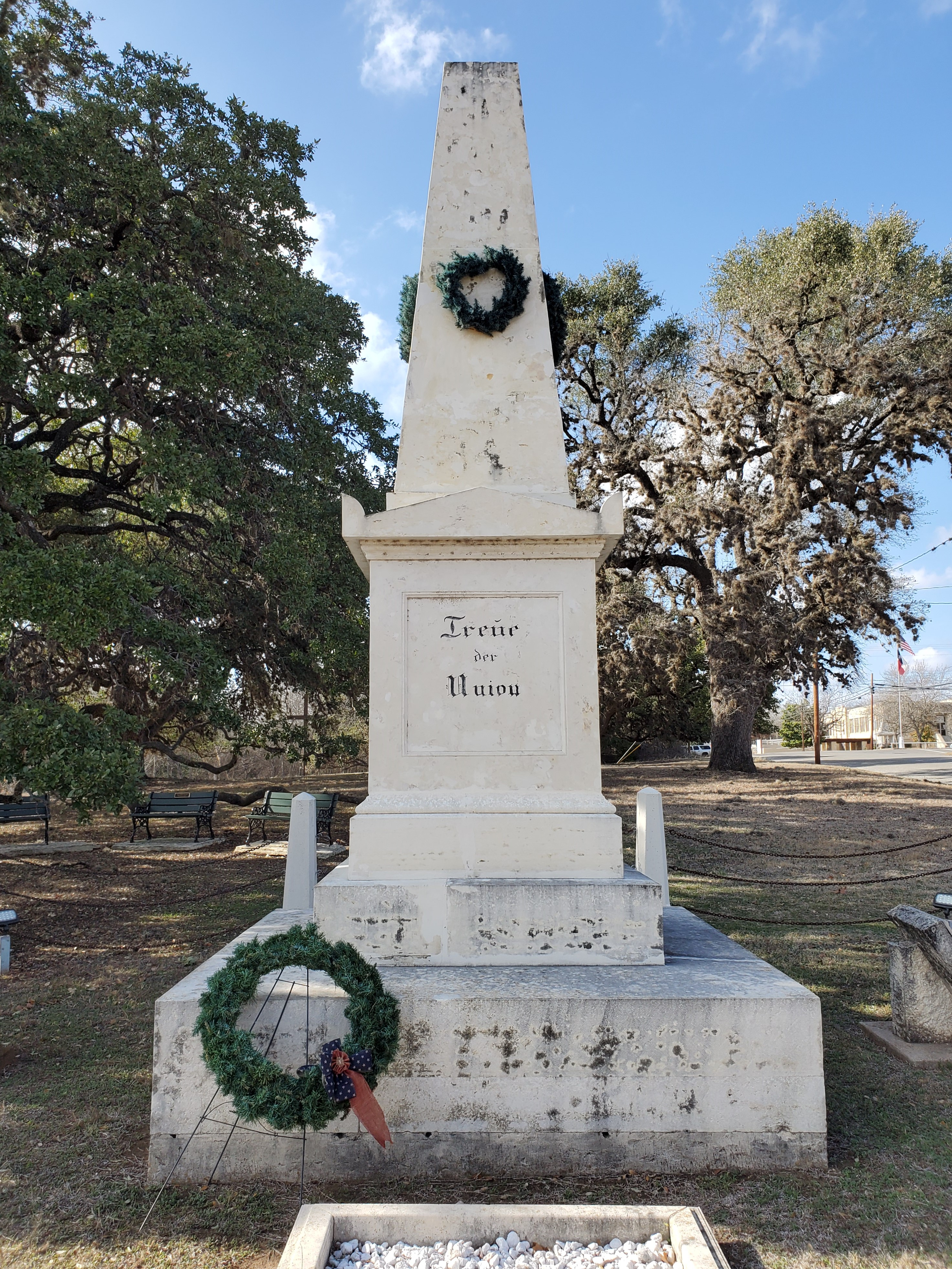
- Treue der Union Monument

- Location within Texas Location within the United States
- Location: High Street, between Third and Fourth; Comfort, Texas
- Coordinates: 29°58′10″N 98°54′49″W
- Area: less than one acre
- Built: 1866
- Part of: Comfort Historic District (ID79002989)
- NRHP reference No.: 78002966
- TSAL No.: 8200000407

Significant dates
- Added to NRHP: November 29, 1978
- Designated CP: May 29, 1979
- Designated TSAL: January 1, 1996

The German-American Treue der Union Monument (Loyalty to the Union), is located in the Kendall County community of Comfort in the U.S. state of Texas. It was dedicated on August 10, 1866 to commemorate the German-Texans who died at the 1862 Nueces massacre. Thirty-four were killed, some executed after being taken prisoner, for refusing to sign loyalty oaths to the Confederacy. With the exception of those drowned in the Rio Grande, the remains of the murdered are buried at the site of the monument. This monument was added to the U.S. National Register of Historic Places in 1978.

== The battle ==
In 1862, the Confederate States of America imposed martial law on Central Texas, due to resistance to the Civil War. Jacob Kuechler served as a guide for sixty-one conscientious objectors attempting to flee to Mexico. Scottish born Confederate irregular James Duff and his Duff's Partisan Rangers pursued and overtook them at the Nueces River.

Thirty-four were killed, some executed after being taken prisoner. Jacob Kuechler survived the Nueces massacre. The cruelty shocked the people of Gillespie County and surrounding areas. Two thousand took to the hills to escape Duff's reign of terror.

== The monument ==
On August 19, 1865, Eduard Degener, Eduard Steves, and William Heuermann paid $20 for a lot in Comfort, for the purpose of building a monument. The bodies of those who drowned in the massacre were never recovered. The bodies of the remaining massacre victims were recovered for burial by local residents in a mass grave on the lot purchased by Degener, Steves and Heuermann. On August 20, 1865, at Comfort, Texas, three hundred people attended the funeral for the remains of the victims of the massacre. The funeral cortege was accompanied by Federal troops who fired a salute over the mass grave. Edward Degener, father of victims Hugo and Hilmar, delivered the eulogy.

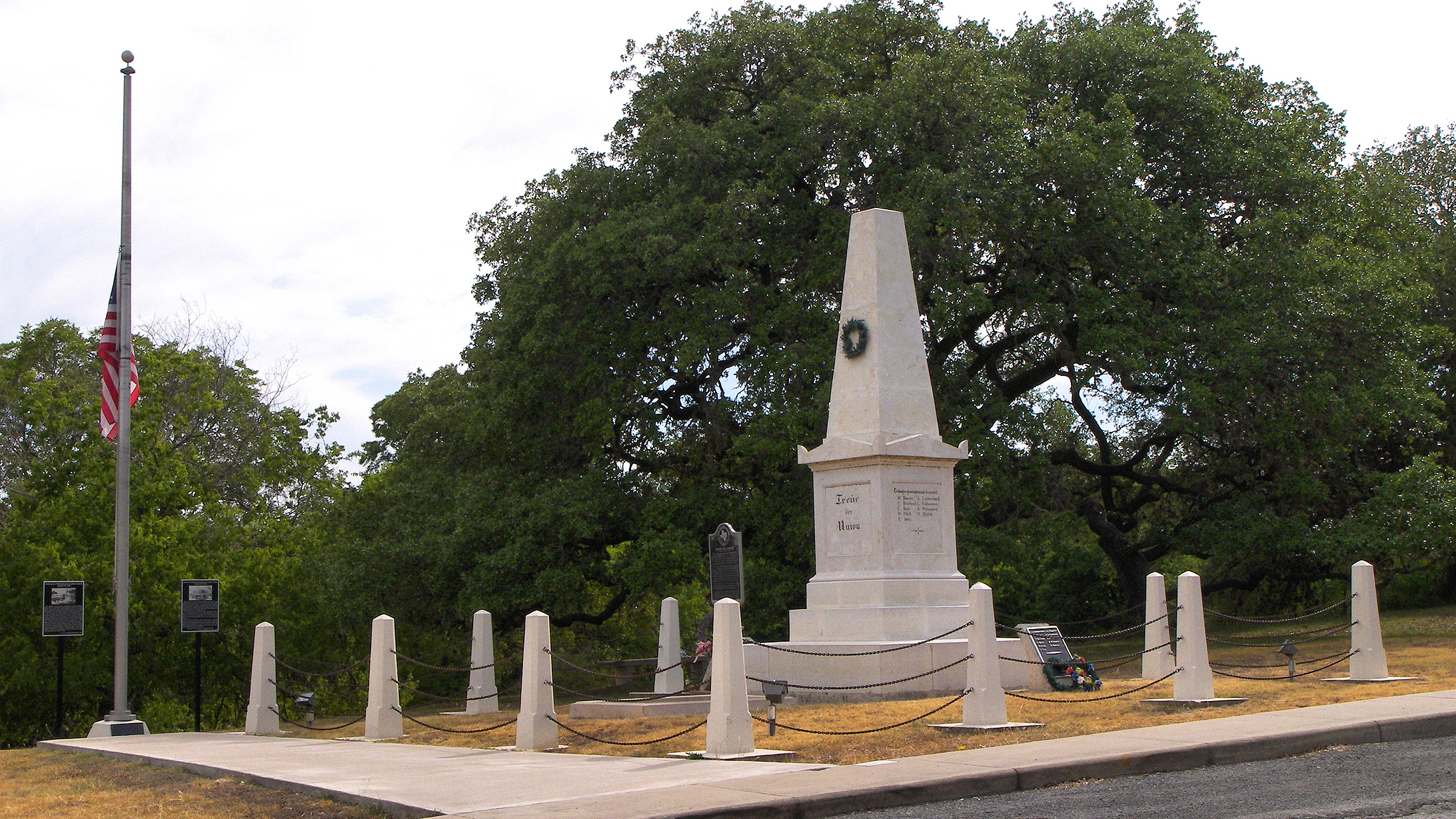
Treue der Union monument, with flag flying at half mast

With donations from local residents and families of the victims, the Treue der Union Monument was dedicated on August 10, 1866 in Kendall County. The obelisk stands twenty feet high and was constructed of native limestone by local stonemasons and several carvers. The main obelisk weighs 35,700 pounds (16,200 kg), with the top containing the original four name tablets. The United States 1865 flag has thirty-six stars, representing the number of states at the time of the monument dedication. On the lawn at the base are four name tablets in German. Inside the second course of the monument is a time capsule.

In 1994, the Comfort Heritage Foundation oversaw a restoration conducted by Boerne stonemason Karl H. Kuhn.

== Names on Treue der Union Monument ==
Treue der Union Monument
Name	1862 death	Place of death	Notes	Ref.
Leopold Bauer	August 10	Nueces River		
Frederick Behrens	August 10	Nueces River	aka Fritz Beherens	
Ernst Beseler	August 10	Nueces River		
Conrad Andreas Christian Bock	Unknown	Fredericksburg		
Louis Boerner	August 10	Nueces River		
Wilhelm Boerner	August 10	Nueces River		
Johann Peter Bonnet	October 18	Rio Grande		
Theo Bruckisch			New Braunfels carpenter	
Albert Bruns	August 10	Nueces River		
Hilmar Degener	August 10	Nueces River		
Hugo Degener	August 10	Nueces River		
Pablo Diaz	August 10	Nueces River		
Joseph Elstner	October 18	Rio Grande River		
Edward Felsing	October 18	Rio Grande River		
Herman Flick	August 20	Medio Creek	Sources vary on when and where	
Henry Herrmann	October 18	Rio Grande River		
Valentine Hohmann	October 18	Rio Grande River	Local cattle-rancher.	
John George Kallenberg	August 10	Nueces River		
Fritz Lange	October 18	Rio Grande		
August Luckenbach	Unknown		One of the original Luckenbach family that settled in the hill country.	
Henry Markwardt	August 10	Nueces River		
Adolph Ruebsamen	October 18	Rio Grande River		
Louis Ruebsamen	August 10	Nueces River		
Christian Schaefer	August 10	Nueces River		
Louis Schierholz	August 10	Nueces River		
Aime Schreiner	August 10	Nueces River		
Heinrich Steves Jr.	August 10	Nueces River		
Heinrich Stieler	August 10	Comfort		
Frederich "Fritz" Tays	August 10	Comfort		
Wilhelm Telgmann	August 10	Nueces River		
Adolph Vater	August 10	Nueces River		
Friedrich "Fritz" Vater	August 10	Nueces River		
Michael Weirich	August 10	Nueces River		
Franz Weiss	October 18	Rio Grande River		
Moritz Weiss	October 18	Rio Grande River		
Heinrich "Henry" Weyershausen	August 10	Nueces River		

== In popular culture ==
The Treue der Union monument (1866) has been broadly asserted to be the first monument of the Civil War, and the first Union monument raised on "Confederate" soil. Other Union monuments in former slave states include the Grand Army of the Republic Memorial (Judsonia, Arkansas), the Grand Army of the Republic Memorial (Siloam Springs, Arkansas), the Grand Army of the Republic Memorial Hall (St. Cloud, Florida), Union memorials and graves at Arlington National Cemetery, and numerous monuments at battlefields such as at Vicksburg, Mississippi.

- In an undated entry about the Nueces massacre in The Handbook of Texas Online, the Texas State Historical Association asserts ""It is the only German-American monument to the Union in the South where the remains of those killed in battle are buried, and where, since 1866, a thirty-six star U.S. flag is permitted to fly at half-staff."
- As recently as 2012, in the book Texans and War: New Interpretations of the State's Military History published by Texas A & M University Press, authors Alexander Mendoza and Charles David Grear make the claim that it is "the only shrine to the Union erected by inhabitants on former Confederate soil."
- The 2008 book Civil War Sites: The Official Guide to the Civil War Discovery Trail, compiled by the Civil War Preservation Trust, lists it as "the only memorial to the Union (outside national cemeteries) in Confederate territory, and only one of six places in the nation permitted by Congress to fly the flag at half-staff in perpetuity (and the only one of these to fly the flag with thirty-six stars)."
- In 2006, authors Walter D. Kamphoefner, Wolfgang Helbich and Susan Carter Vogel asserted in Germans in the Civil War: The Letters They Wrote Home that it is "the only monument of its kind in the South."

According to the National Park Service, the 32nd Indiana Monument at Cave Hill National Cemetery in Kentucky "is the oldest Civil War memorial in the country." The 32nd Indiana Infantry Regiment of the Union Army was composed primarily of soldiers of German ancestry. After the December 1861 Battle of Rowlett's Station, regiment private August Bloedner created the limestone memorial in the German language as a tribute to his regiment's fatalities. Also known as the August Bloedner Monument, both the monument and the bodies of those it honors are together in the cemetery.

In a 2012 article for The Southwestern Historical Quarterly, physician and US Army veteran Frank Wilson Kiel sorted known facts from lore about the monument. Citing monuments to the Union on Southern soil, he names two memorials in Tennessee, Greeneville and Cleveland, as well as three others in Texas, Denison, Dallas and New Braunfels. The claim of Treue der Union being the oldest is discredited by the 1863 Hazen Brigade Monument at Stones River National Battlefield in Tennessee and the 1861 August Bloedner Monument in Kentucky. Kiel traces the trail of misinformation back as far as 1938. Accordingly, he states that there is no protocol for flying a flag at half-mast, but rather a matter of choice for non-governmental institutions such as the Comfort Heritage Foundation. The misunderstanding stemmed from personal communications between one congressman and two different individuals associated with the monument. Congress never passed legislation on the issue.

== See also ==
- German Americans in the Civil War
- National Register of Historic Places listings in Kendall County, Texas

=== Bibliography ===
- McGowen, Stanley S (July 2000). "Battle or Massacre?: The Incident on the Nueces, August 10, 1862". Southwestern Historical Quarterly. 104 (1). Denton, TX: Texas State Historical Association: 64–86.
- "Treue Der Union Memorial Cemetery - Kendall County, Texas | Burial & Family History Records". texasgravestones.org.
- Kiel, Frank Wilson (2013). Civil War soldiers of Kendall County, Texas : a biographical dictionary (First ed.). Comfort, Texas: The Portal to Texas History. ISBN 978-0-9834160-1-2.
