= Otto Brinkmann House =

Historic house in Texas, United States

- U.S. National Register of Historic Places
- U.S. Historic district – Contributing property
- Recorded Texas Historic Landmark
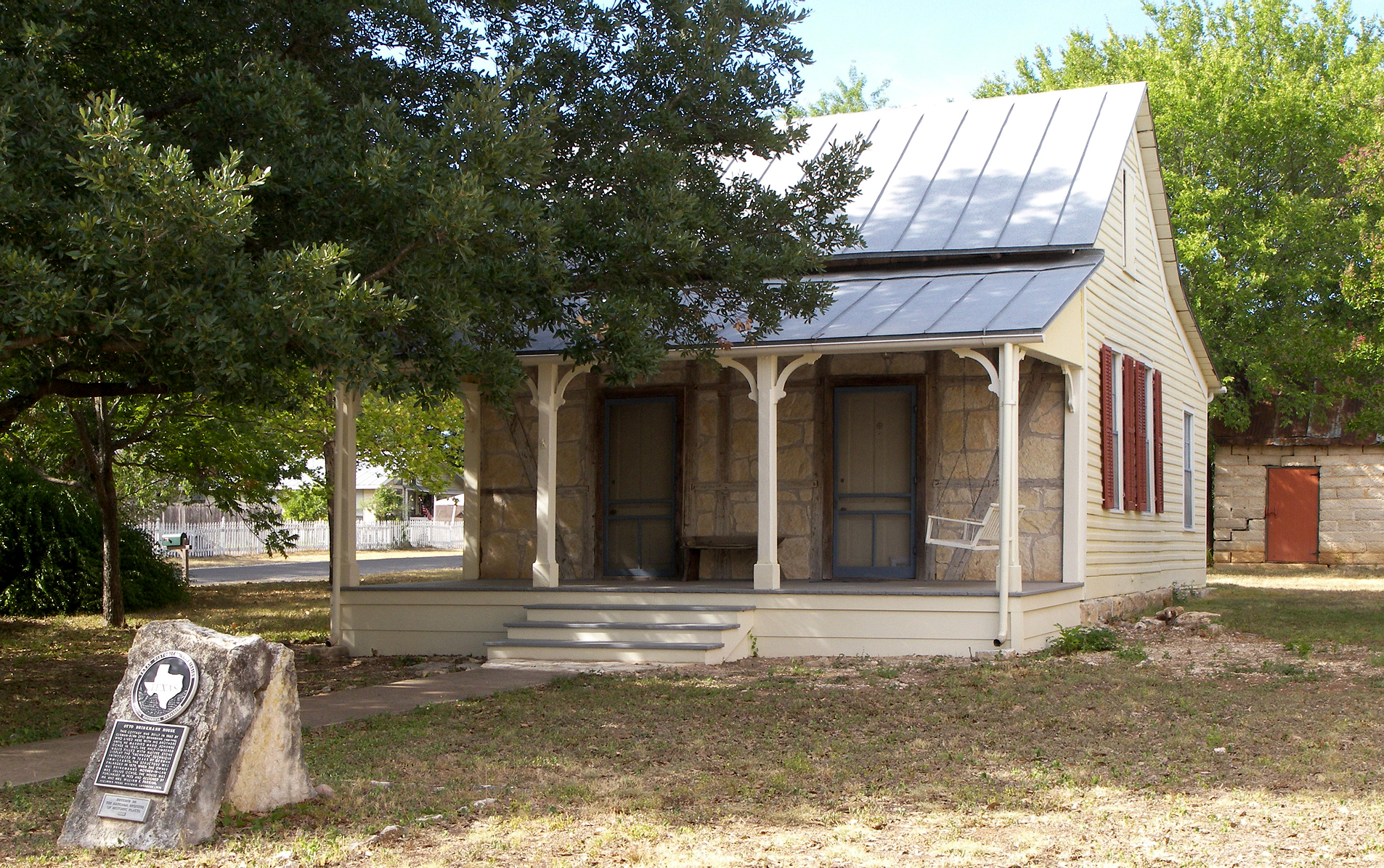
- Otto Brinkmann House in 2009

- Location within Texas Location within the United States
- Location: 602 High St., Comfort, Texas
- Coordinates: 29°58′4″N 98°54′32″W
- Area: 0.5 acres (0.20 ha)
- Built: 1861
- Built by: Otto Brinkmann
- Part of: Comfort Historic District (ID79002989)
- NRHP reference No.: 77001457
- RTHL No.: 3882

Significant dates
- Added to NRHP: December 12, 1977
- Designated CP: May 29, 1979
- Designated RTHL: 1976

The Otto Brinkmann House in Comfort, Texas, United States, was built in 1861 by Otto Brinkmann. It was designated a Recorded Texas Historic Landmark in 1976 and listed on the National Register of Historic Places in 1977.

It is a one-story two-room house of fachwerk construction. It is a German method of timber framing with diagonal bracing members at corners and openings. It includes 6 inches (150 mm) by 6 inches (150 mm) cypress corner posts and top plates, with other timbers of 4 inches (100 mm) by 4 inches (100 mm) size. Timbers are joined by mortise and tenon joints. Timbers on its front facade are exposed. The house was modified in 1899 by addition of a framed lean-to along its rear facade.

It was built, and lived in, by German immigrant carpenter Otto Brinkman, who was born in Hoexter, Westphalia in 1932. He completed an apprenticeship to a cabinet-maker in Germany before coming to the U.S. in 1852.

== See also ==
- National Register of Historic Places listings in Kendall County, Texas
- Recorded Texas Historic Landmarks in Kendall County
