= Kendall Inn =

- U.S. National Register of Historic Places
- Recorded Texas Historic Landmark
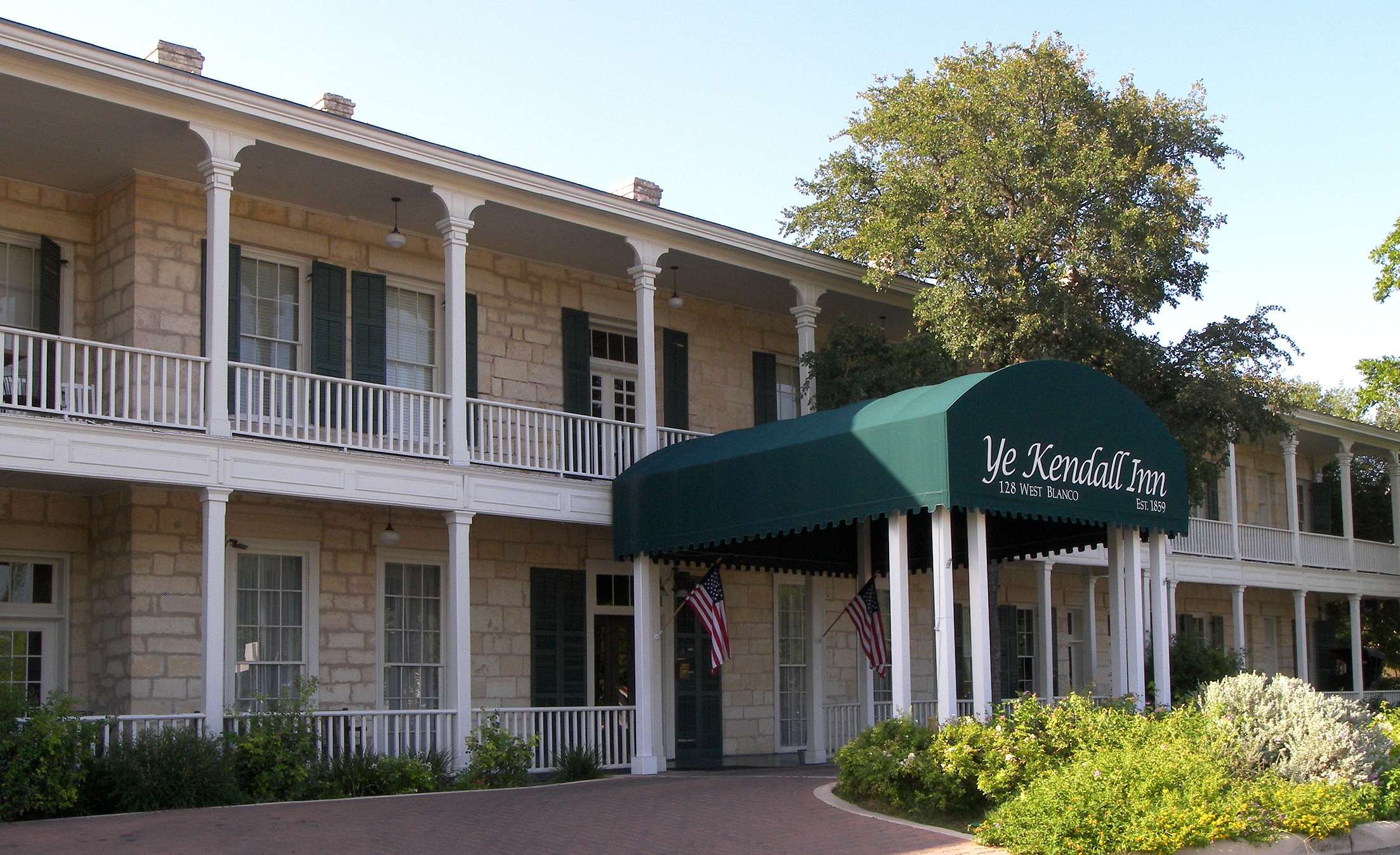
- The Kendall Inn in 2009.

- Location within Texas Location within the United States
- Location: Off US 87, Boerne, Texas
- Coordinates: 29°47′39″N 98°44′1″W
- Area: 2 acres (0.81 ha)
- Built: 1859
- Built by: Erastus Reed, J.C. Rountree, and W.L. Wadsworth
- Architectural style: Greek Revival
- NRHP reference No.: 76002045
- RTHL No.: 5925

Significant dates
- Added to NRHP: June 29, 1976
- Designated RTHL: 1962

The Kendall Inn is a historic hotel located in Boerne, Texas, United States, that originally opened in 1859. The building was added to the National Register of Historic Places on June 29, 1976.

The two-story vernacular Greek Revival structure is one of the few remaining 19th century resort hotels in Texas. Erastus and Sarah Reed constructed the limestone block hotel. The Reeds came to Boerne from Georgia, where they had operated and managed hotels. The Inn was known as the "Reed House" and offered four rooms for travelers.

In 1869, Col. Henry C. King purchased the inn from the Reeds and renamed the hotel "King Place". In 1878, J. C. Rountree and W. L. Wadsworth purchased the inn from King and added two wings on to the building. The name of the inn was changed to the "Boerne Hotel". In 1884, the inn was purchased by James T. Clarke. Dr. J. H. Barnitz of San Antonio acquired the inn in 1909 and renamed the hotel "Ye Kendall Inn", Barnitz had electrical wiring installed and added community bathrooms. In 1922, the inn was purchased by Robert L. and Maude Hickman. Mrs. W. F. Grinnan bought the Kendall Inn in 1960.

Notable people that have lodged at the inn include Jefferson Davis, President Dwight D. Eisenhower and Robert E. Lee.

The hotel is currently called The Kendall and has 34 rooms each with modern and Texas Hill Country design. The entire Hotel was updated and renovated in late 2018 and early 2019.

It was designated a Recorded Texas Historic Landmark in 1983, Marker number 5925.

== See also ==
- National Register of Historic Places listings in Kendall County, Texas
- Recorded Texas Historic Landmarks in Kendall County
