= Comfort Independent School District =

School district in Texas, United States

Address
- 232 High Street Comfort, Texas, 78013; United States

District information
- Grades: PK–12
- Schools: 3
- NCES District ID: 4814790

Students and staff
- Students: 1,090 (2023–2024)
- Teachers: 81.65 (on an FTE basis)
- Student–teacher ratio: 13.35:1

Other information
- Website: www.comfort.txed.net

Comfort Independent School District is a public school district based in the community of Comfort, Texas (USA).

Located in Kendall County, a portion of the district extends into Kerr County.

In 2009, the school district was rated "academically acceptable" by the Texas Education Agency.

== Schools ==
- Comfort High (Grades 9–12)
  - The school has separate mascots for its boys' and girls' teams: the boys' teams are called the Bobcats while the girls' teams are called the Deer.
- Comfort Middle (Grades 6–8)
- Comfort Elementary (Grades PK–5)
