= Kendall County Courthouse and Jail (Texas) =

- U.S. National Register of Historic Places
- Texas State Antiquities Landmark
- Recorded Texas Historic Landmark
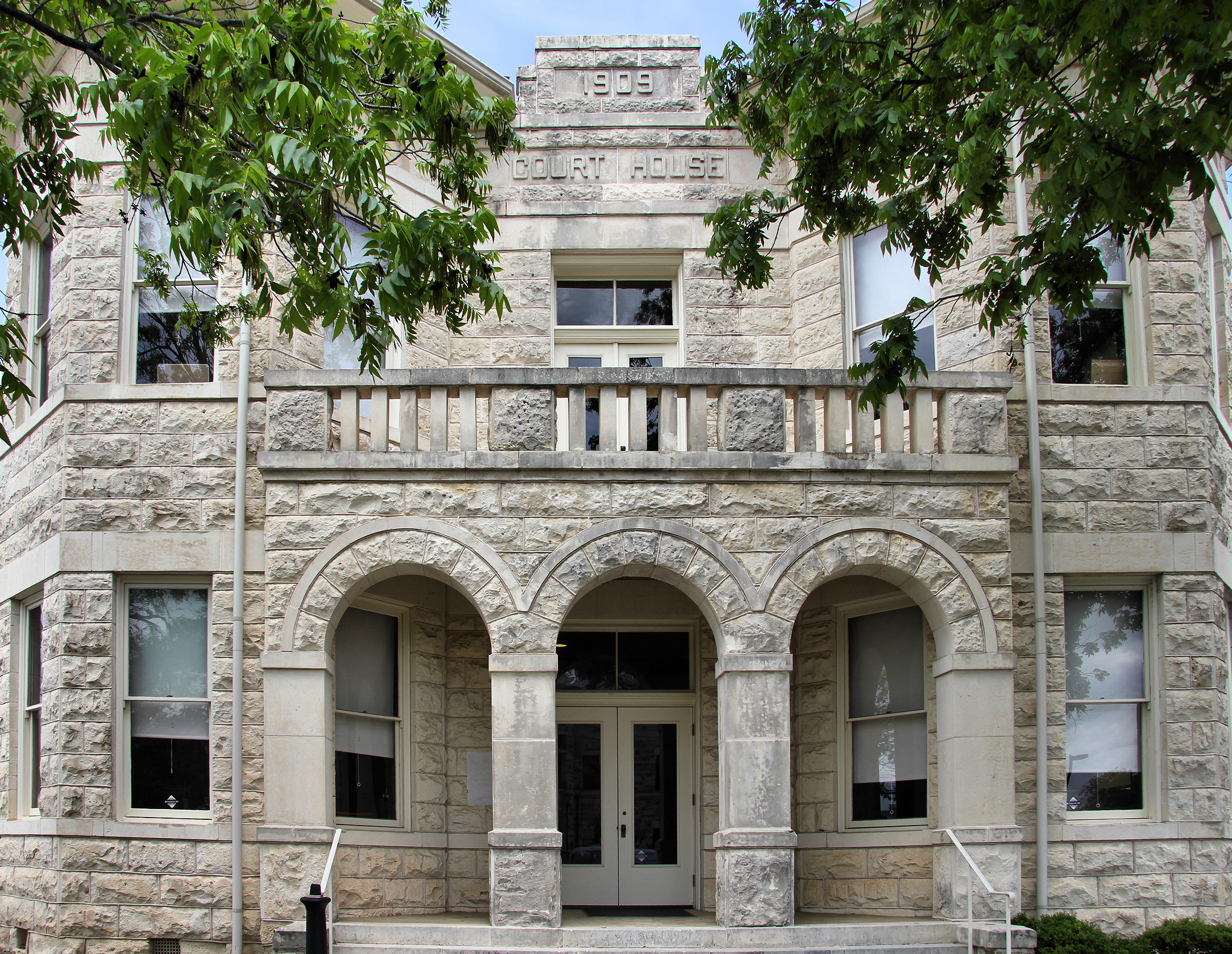
- The historic Kendall County Courthouse in 2013

- Location within Texas Location within the United States
- Interactive map showing the location of Kendall County Courthouse and Jail
- Location: Public Square, Boerne, Texas
- Coordinates: 29°47′40″N 98°43′50″W
- Area: 3 acres (1.2 ha)
- Built: 1869
- Architect: Multiple
- Architectural style: Gothic, Romanesque
- NRHP reference No.: 80004138
- TSAL No.: 406
- RTHL No.: 2921

Significant dates
- Added to NRHP: February 15, 1980
- Designated TSAL: May 28, 1981
- Designated RTHL: 1970

The limestone Kendall County Courthouse and Jail are located in the San Antonio suburb of Boerne in the U.S. state of Texas. They were added to the National Register of Historic Places in 1980 and the courthouse as a Recorded Texas Historic Landmark in 1970.

The courthouse was built as one storey in 1870 on land donated by local surveyor John James, and the limestone blocks came from local quarries. Philip Zoeller and J. F. Stendebach were the designers. In 1886, a second storey was added by Charles Buckel. Alfred Giles was contracted to add the 1909 front facade. The courthouse was in service until 1998, when Kendall County built a new courthouse across the street.

The 1887 limestone jail was designed and built by Pauly Jail Building and Manufacturing Company.

== See also ==
- National Register of Historic Places listings in Kendall County, Texas
- Recorded Texas Historic Landmarks in Kendall County
