= Herff =

Herff can be both a middle name and a surname. Notable people with the name include:

== Given name ==
- Marshall Herff Applewhite Jr. (1931–1997), American new religious leader

== Surname ==
- Ferdinand Ludwig Herff (1820–1912), German-American physician
- Herbert Herff (1891–1966), American businessman

== See also ==
- Maximilian von Herff (1893–1945), Nazi German SS commander
- Herff–Brooks Corporation, former American automobile manufacturer
- Herff College of Engineering, in the University of Memphis
- Herff Jones, American company
- Herff–Rozelle Farm, historic property in Boerne, Texas, U.S.
