= Hygieostatic Bat Roost =

- U.S. National Register of Historic Places
- Recorded Texas Historic Landmark
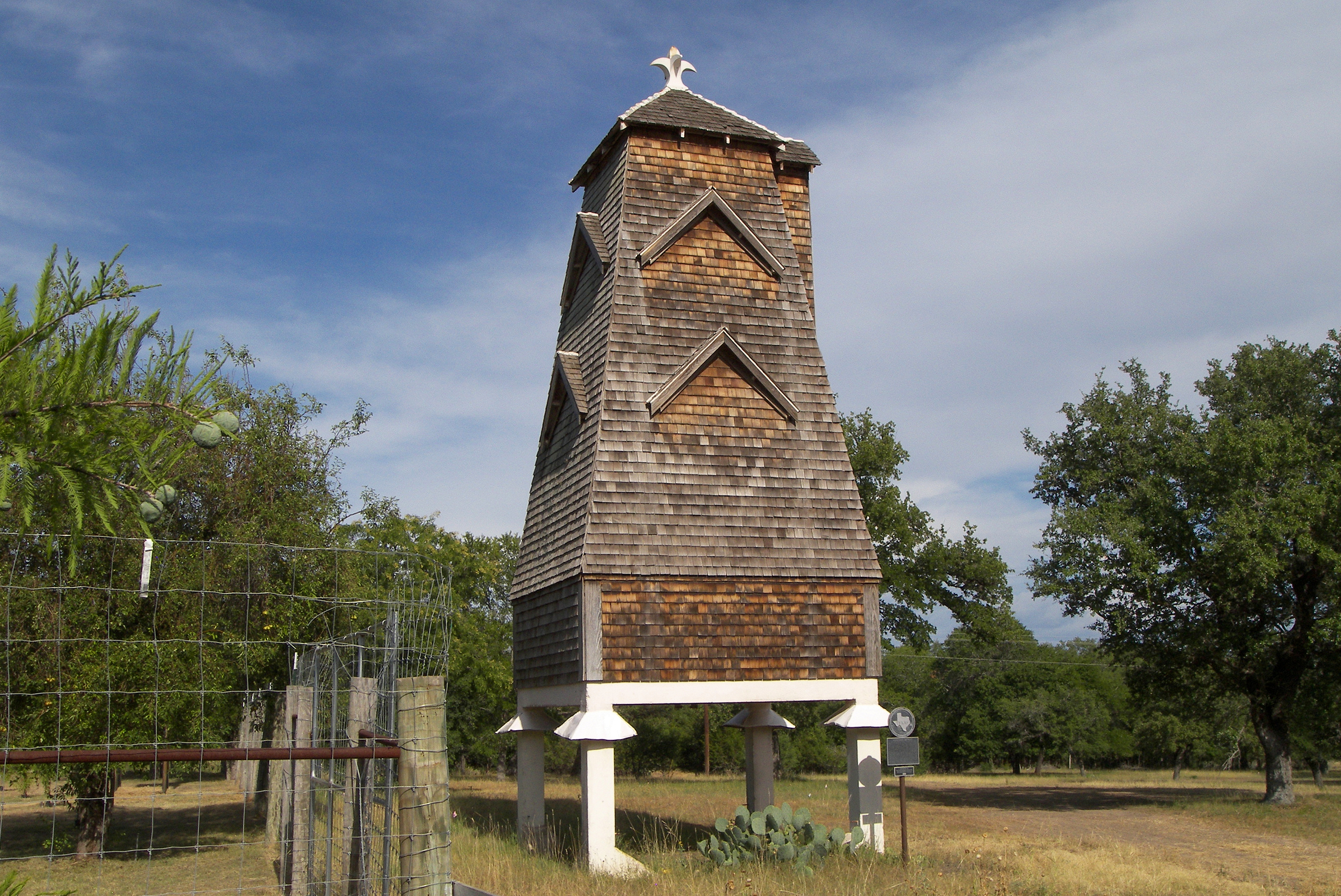
- Hygieostatic Bat Roost in 2009

- Location within Texas Location within the United States
- Nearest city: Comfort, Texas
- Coordinates: 29°58′13″N 98°53′5″W
- Area: less than one acre
- Built: 1918
- Architect: Charles A. R. Campbell
- NRHP reference No.: 83003144
- RTHL No.: 2608

Significant dates
- Added to NRHP: March 28, 1983
- Designated RTHL: 1981

The Hygieostatic Bat Roost is located in Kendall County, approximately 1.5 miles (2.4 km) east of Comfort on the south side of RM 473, in the U.S. state of Texas. It was erected in 1918 on property owned by former San Antonio Mayor Pro Tem Albert Steves, who had commissioned San Antonio health officer Dr. Charles A. R. Campbell to design the structure. The shingled pyramid-shaped raised tower stands 30 feet (9.1 m) high. One dormer serves as an entrance for the bats, while the other dormers are ornamental. The lower portion of the tower allows access for humans. The concrete base of the tower is raised 7 feet (2.1 m) off the ground, facilitating wagons being driven beneath to collect the guano.

Campbell had been researching a method of controlling the spread of mosquito-carried malaria, by encouraging the insect's natural enemy, the bat. Although mosquitoes have other natural enemies, many of them are active only during the daytime hours, while bats fly in search of food during the night when mosquitoes are most active. Campbell patented his bat roost design and erected several of them in the San Antonio area beginning in 1907. When the bat roost was built on his Kendall County property, Steves coined the name Hygieostatic Bat Roost based on the Greek words hygiea (health) and stasis (standing). The descendants of Albert Steves still own the property where the tower is located. It was designated a Recorded Texas Historic Landmark in 1981. In 1983, the roost was added to the National Register of Historic Places.

== See also ==
- National Register of Historic Places listings in Kendall County, Texas
- Recorded Texas Historic Landmarks in Kendall County
