= Richardson-Brinkman Cobblestone House =

Historic house in Wisconsin, United States

- U.S. National Register of Historic Places
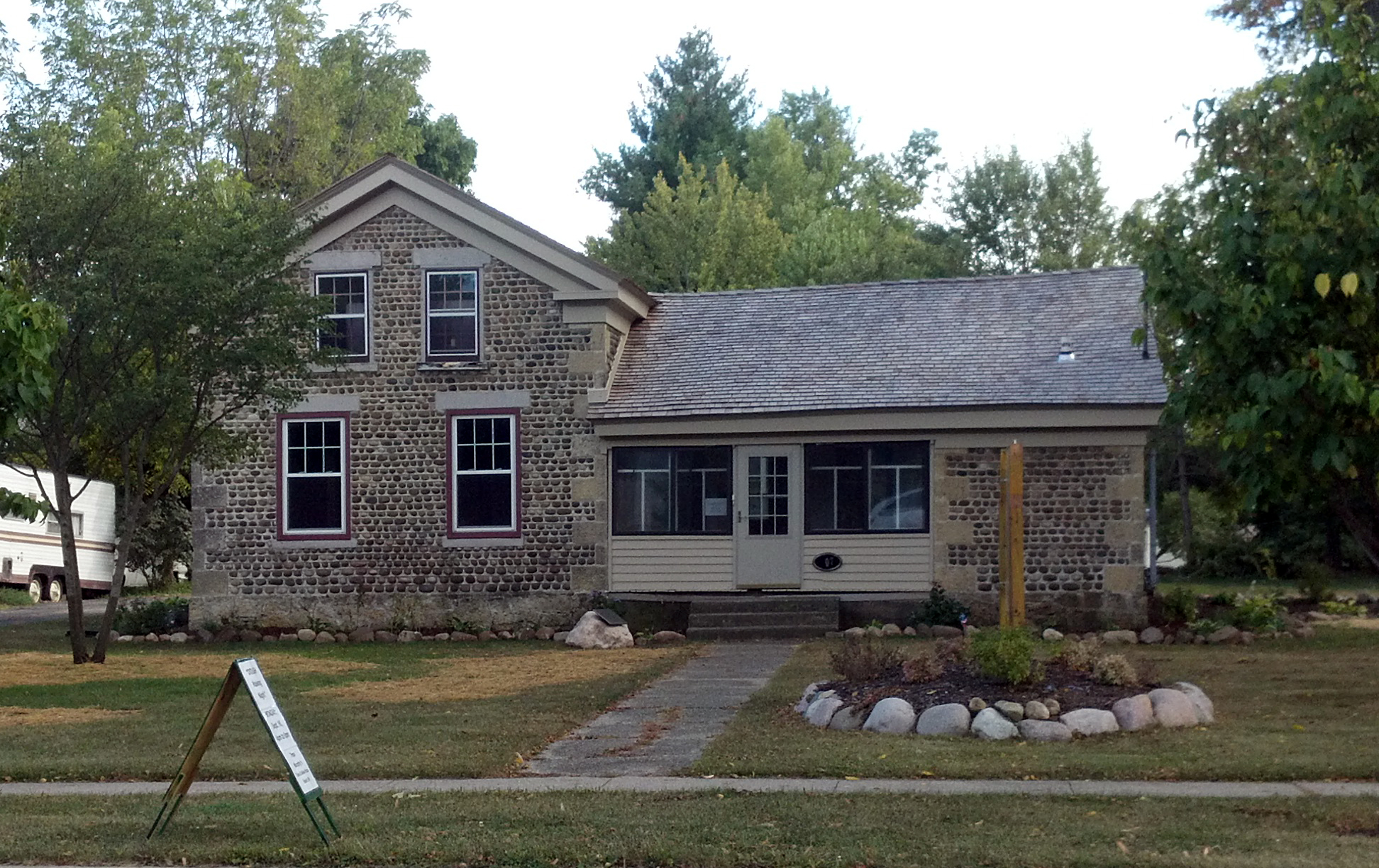

- Location within Wisconsin Location within the United States
- Location: 607 W. Milwaukee Rd., Clinton, Wisconsin
- Coordinates: 42°33′27″N 88°51′58″W
- Area: 0.4 acres (0.16 ha)
- Built: 1843
- Built by: Alonso Richardson
- Architectural style: Greek Revival
- MPS: Cobblestone Buildings of Rock County TR (AD)
- NRHP reference No.: 77000052
- Added to NRHP: July 28, 1977

The Richardson-Brinkman Cobblestone House, located at 607 W. Milwaukee Rd. in Clinton, Wisconsin, United States, is a cobblestone house in Greek Revival style that was built in 1843. It has also been known as simply Cobblestone House. It was listed on the National Register of Historic Places in 1977. The listing included two contributing buildings.

== Description and history ==
The house has walls that are 16 to 18 inches thick. It has a one-and-a-half-story gable-roofed 18-foot (5.5 m) by 24-foot (7.3 m) section and a one-story gable-roofed 22-foot (6.7 m) wing. Its Greek Revival features include a returned cornice, straight wooden lintels, and tooled limestone quoins. It was built in 1843 by Alonso Richardson.
