= Herff–Rozelle Farm =

- U.S. National Register of Historic Places
- U.S. Historic district
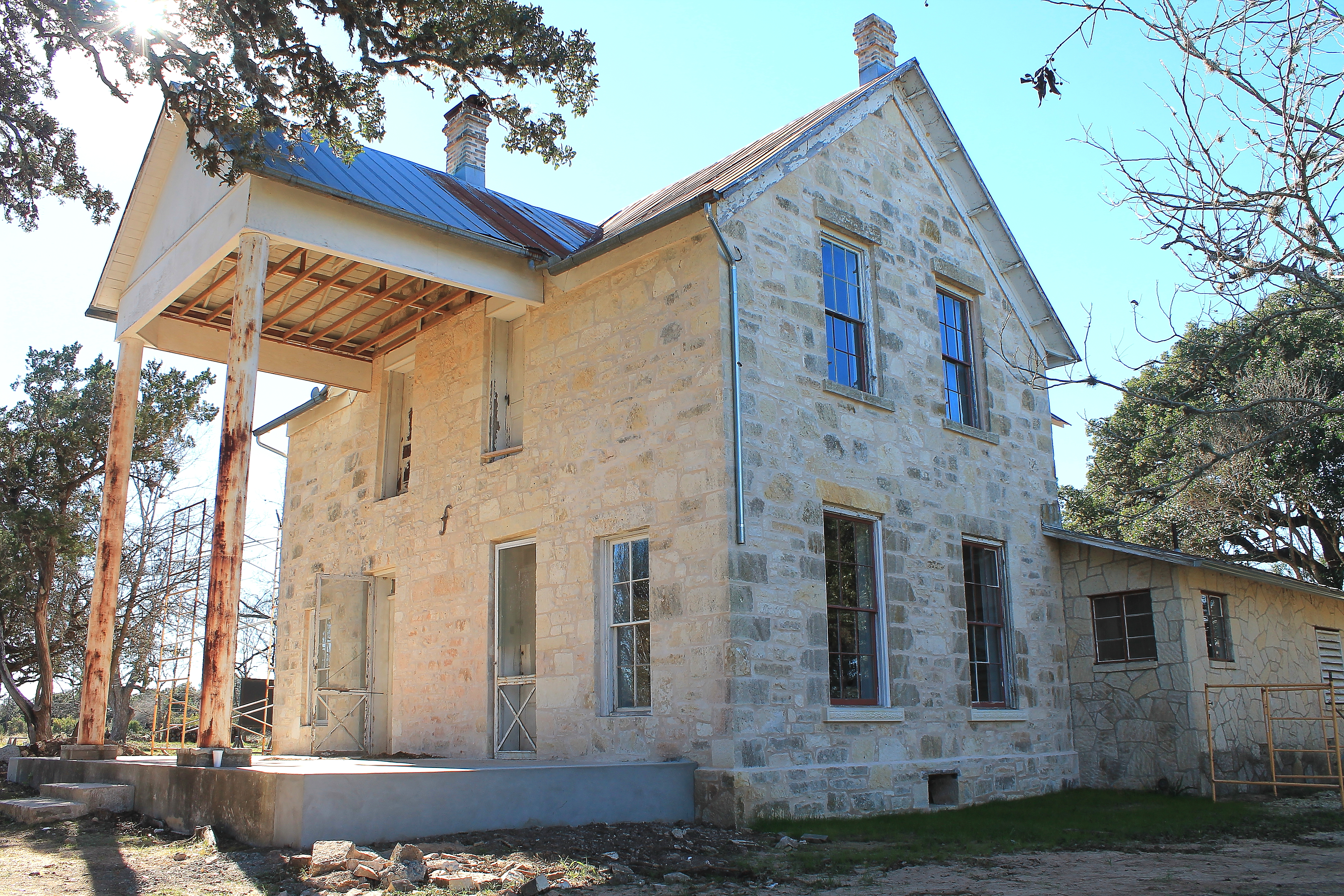
- Herff–Rozelle Farm in 2012

- Location within Texas Location within the United States
- Location: 33 Heroff Rd., Boerne, Texas
- Coordinates: 29°46′51″N 98°42′53″W
- Area: 56.5 acres (22.9 ha)
- Built: 1883
- Built by: Ferdinand Ludwig Herff
- Architectural style: Classical Revival
- NRHP reference No.: 09000983
- Added to NRHP: December 3, 2009

Herff–Rozelle Farm is located in Boerne, in the county of Kendall, in the U.S. state of Texas. It was added to the National Register of Historic Places listings in Kendall County on December 3, 2009. It was built by Ferdinand Ludwig Herff in 1855. The property was sold to George and Erma Rozelle in 1935. It is managed by the Cibolo Nature Center.

== Photo gallery ==
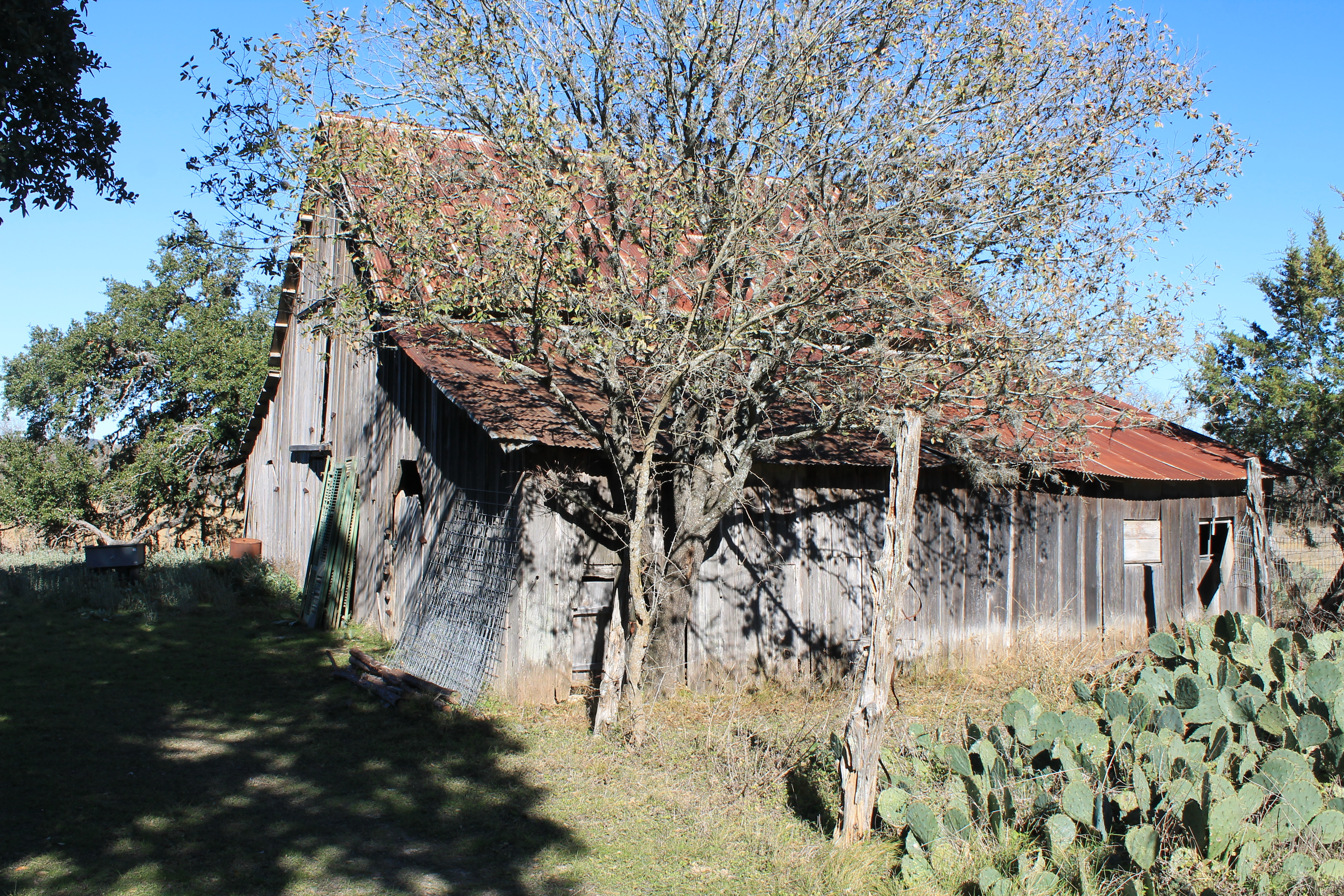

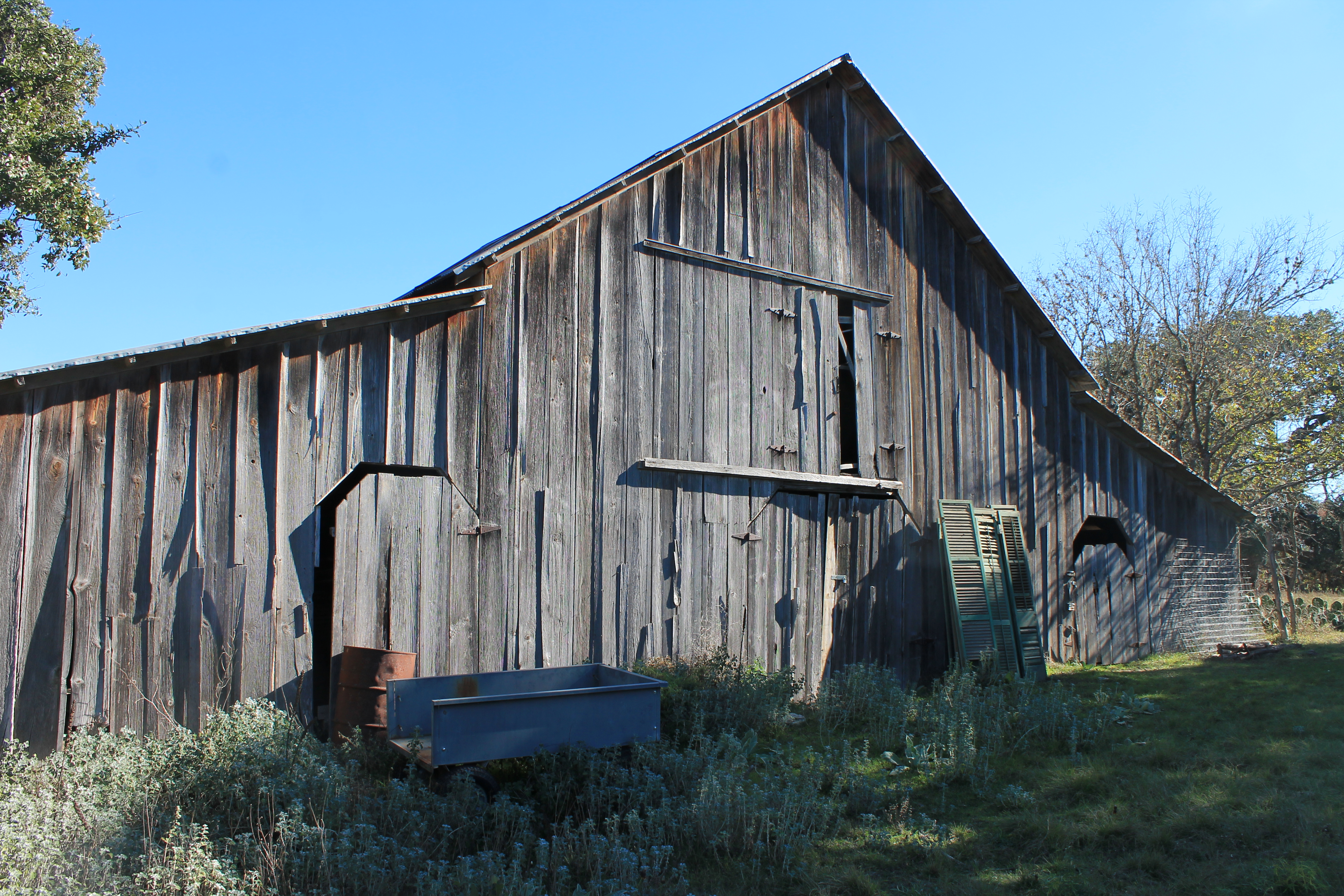

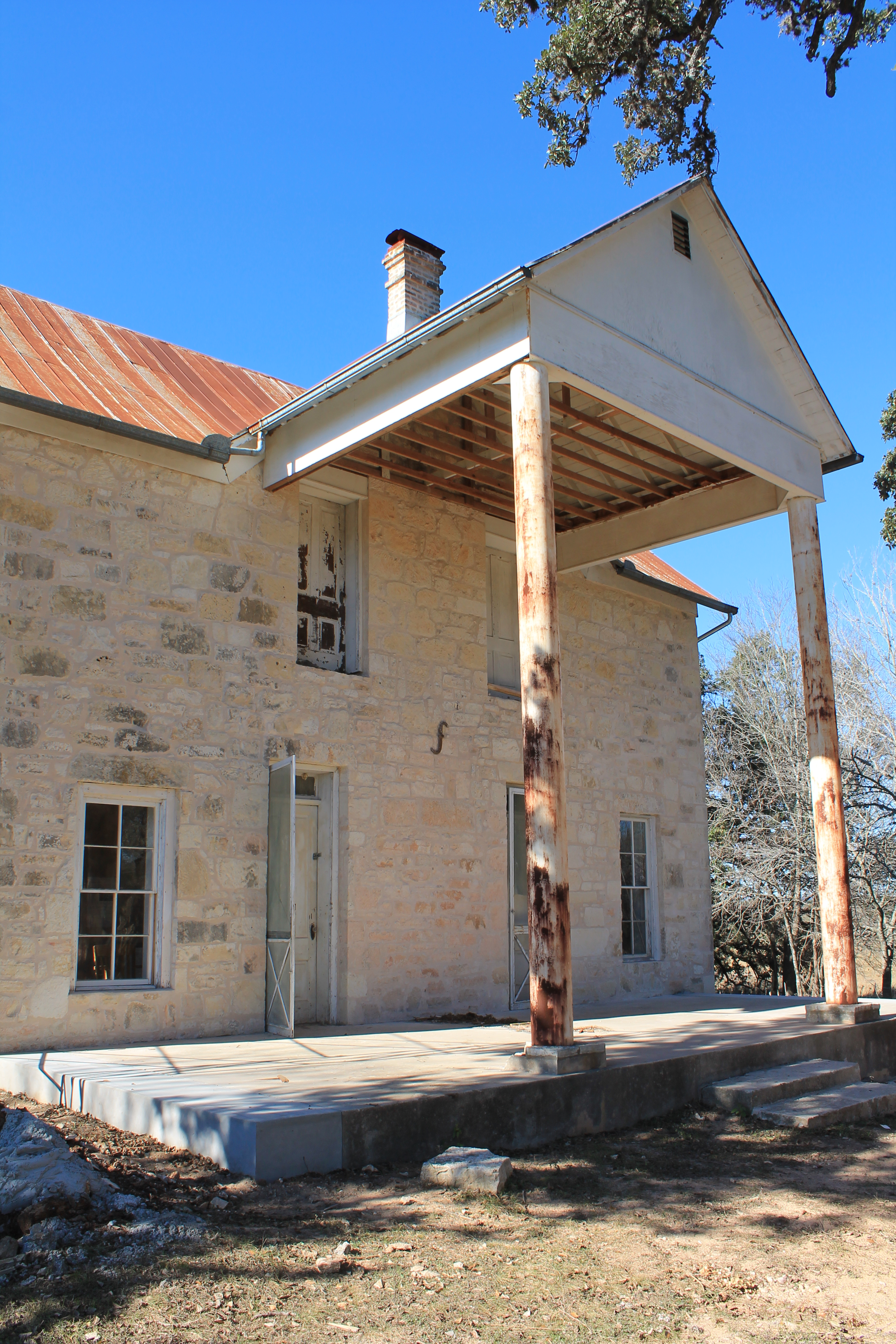

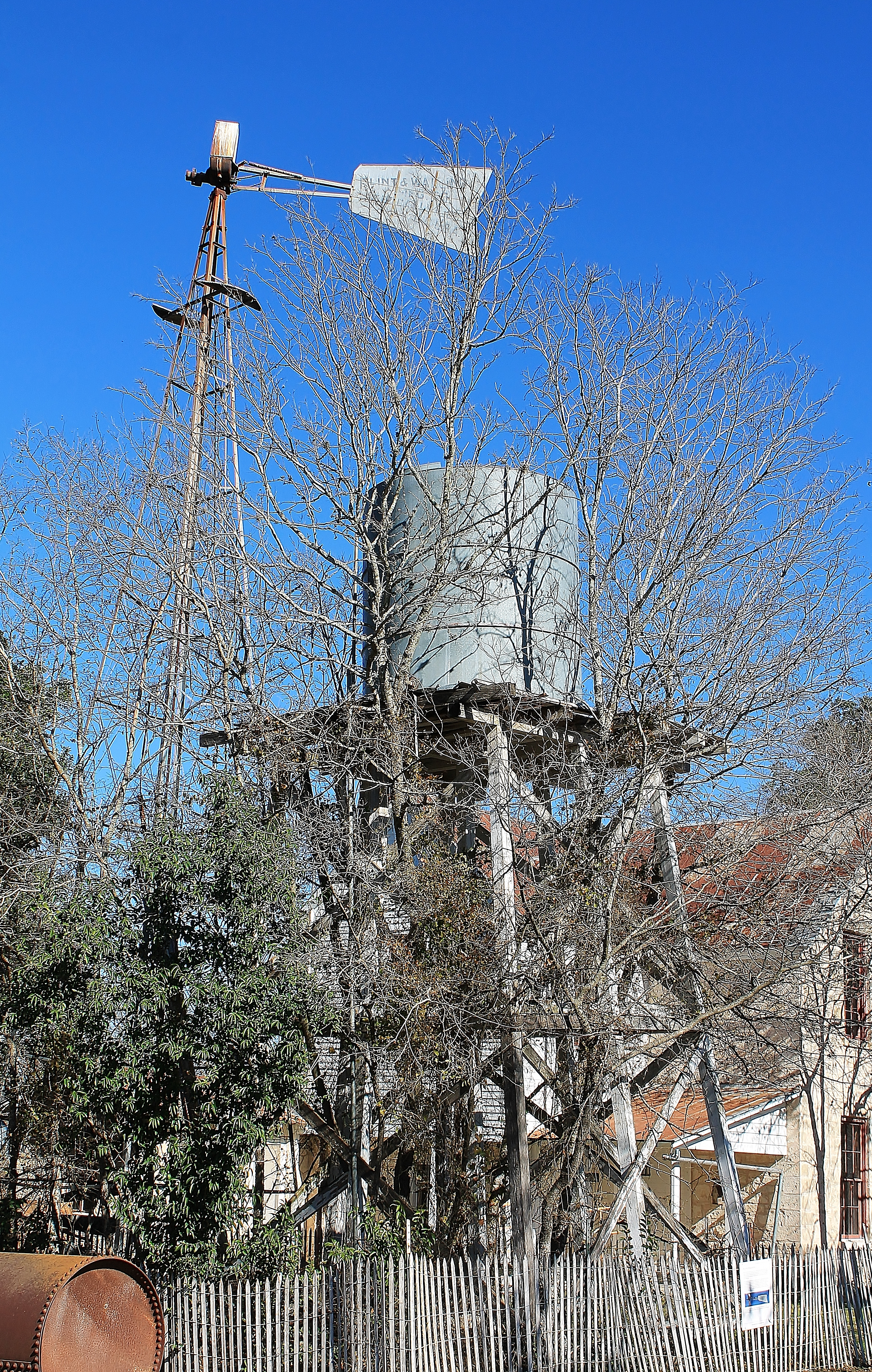

== See also ==
- National Register of Historic Places listings in Kendall County, Texas
