= Herf (surname) =

Herf is a German-Jewish surname; it is known to be one of the surnames attested by former residents of Zichydorf, Serbia in 1944. Notable people with the surname include:

- Eberhard Herf (1887–1946), Nazi German police official and war criminal
- Jeffrey Herf (born 1947), American historian
