= Comfort Historic District =

Historic district in Texas, United States

- U.S. National Register of Historic Places
- U.S. Historic district
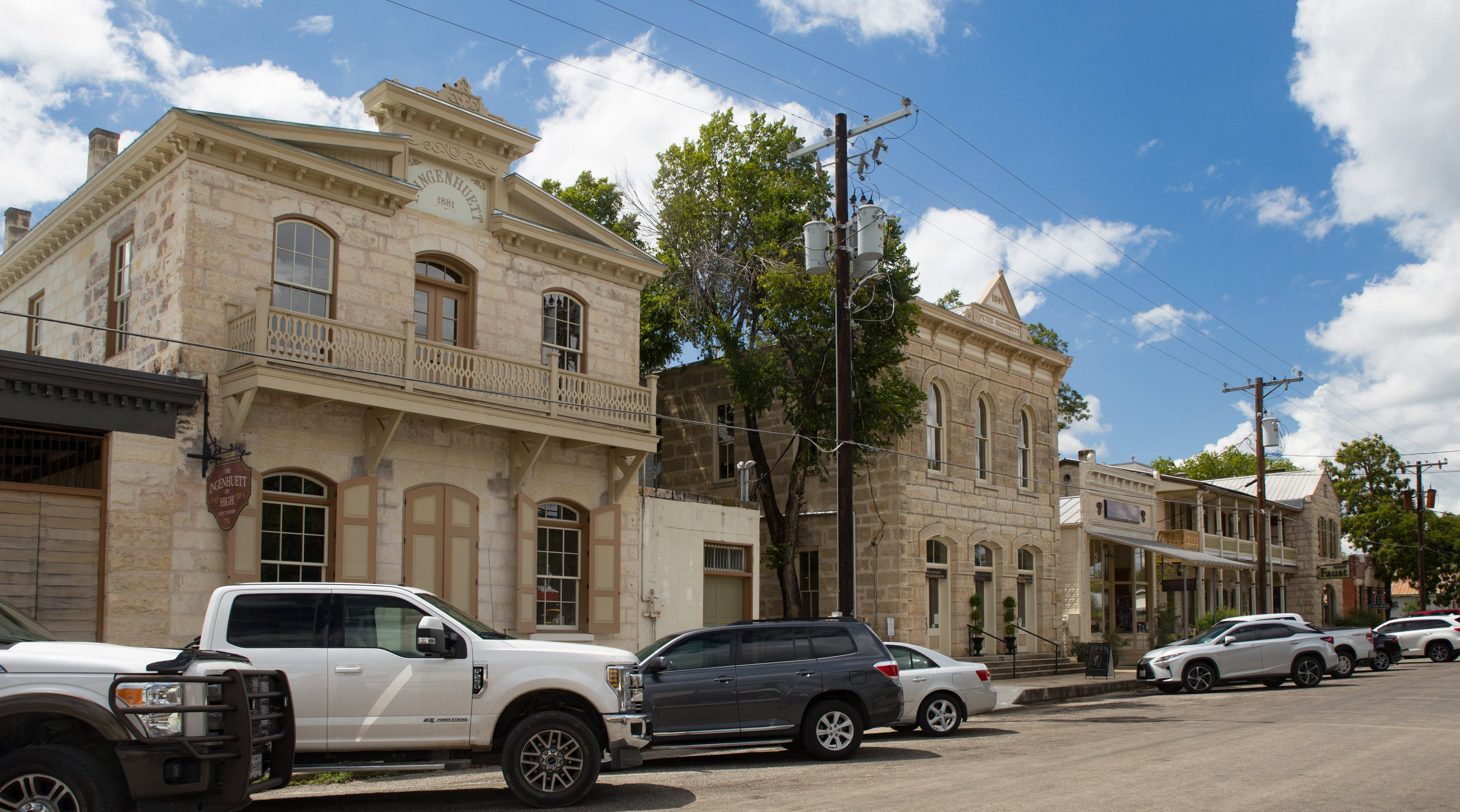
- Buildings in the Comfort Historic District

- Location within Texas Location within the United States
- Location: Roughly bounded by TX 27, Lindner Ave., Cypress Creek, First St., and Front St.,, Comfort, Texas
- Coordinates: 29°58′2″N 98°54′29″W
- Area: 192.5 acres (77.9 ha)
- Built: 1854
- Architect: Alfred Giles, et al.
- Architectural style: Late Victorian, Queen Anne, Modern Movement
- NRHP reference No.: 79002989 (original); 04000911 (increase)

Significant dates
- Added to NRHP: May 29, 1979
- Boundary increase: August 25, 2004

The Comfort Historic District is a historic district listed in the National Register of Historic Places that encompasses almost all of the original townsite of Comfort, Texas and includes over 100 buildings that represents a century of development from 1854 through 1954.

== See also ==
- National Register of Historic Places listings in Kendall County, Texas
- Recorded Texas Historic Landmarks in Kendall County
