= Comfort, Texas =

- Census-designated place
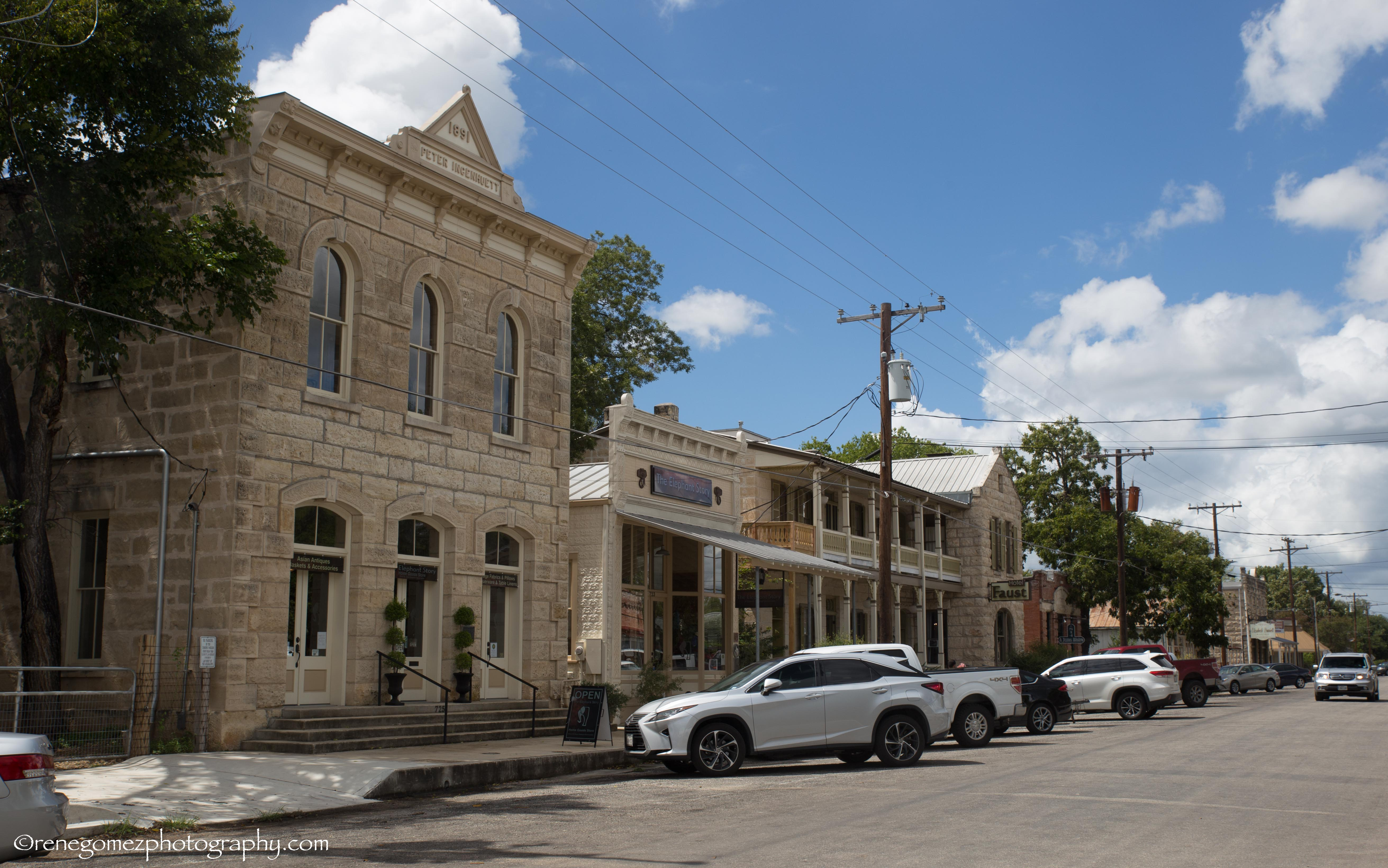
- Historic downtown Comfort

- Location within the state of Texas
- Coordinates: 29°58′10″N 98°54′26″W
- Country: United States
- State: Texas
- County: Kendall

Area
  - Total: 3.24 sq mi (8.38 km^{2})
  - Land: 3.23 sq mi (8.36 km^{2})
  - Water: 0.0077 sq mi (0.02 km^{2})
- Elevation: 1,427 ft (435 m)

Population (2020)
  - Total: 2,211
  - Density: 685/sq mi (264/km^{2})
- Time zone: UTC-6 (Central (CST))
  - Summer (DST): UTC-5 (CDT)
- ZIP code: 78013
- Area code: 830
- FIPS code: 48-16228
- GNIS feature ID: 1333183

Comfort is an unincorporated community and census-designated place (CDP) in Kendall County, Texas, United States. As of the 2020 census, Comfort had a population of 2,211. Comfort was founded by German emigrants on the western end of the Texas-German belt. Many residents of the town today are descendants of those same Germans. Comfort is known for its German heritage and large ranches outside of town.

It lies adjacent to the Guadalupe River, and the 1987 Guadalupe River flood killed 10 people being evacuated from a summer camp sited near Comfort, leaving 33 others missing for a time.

== History ==
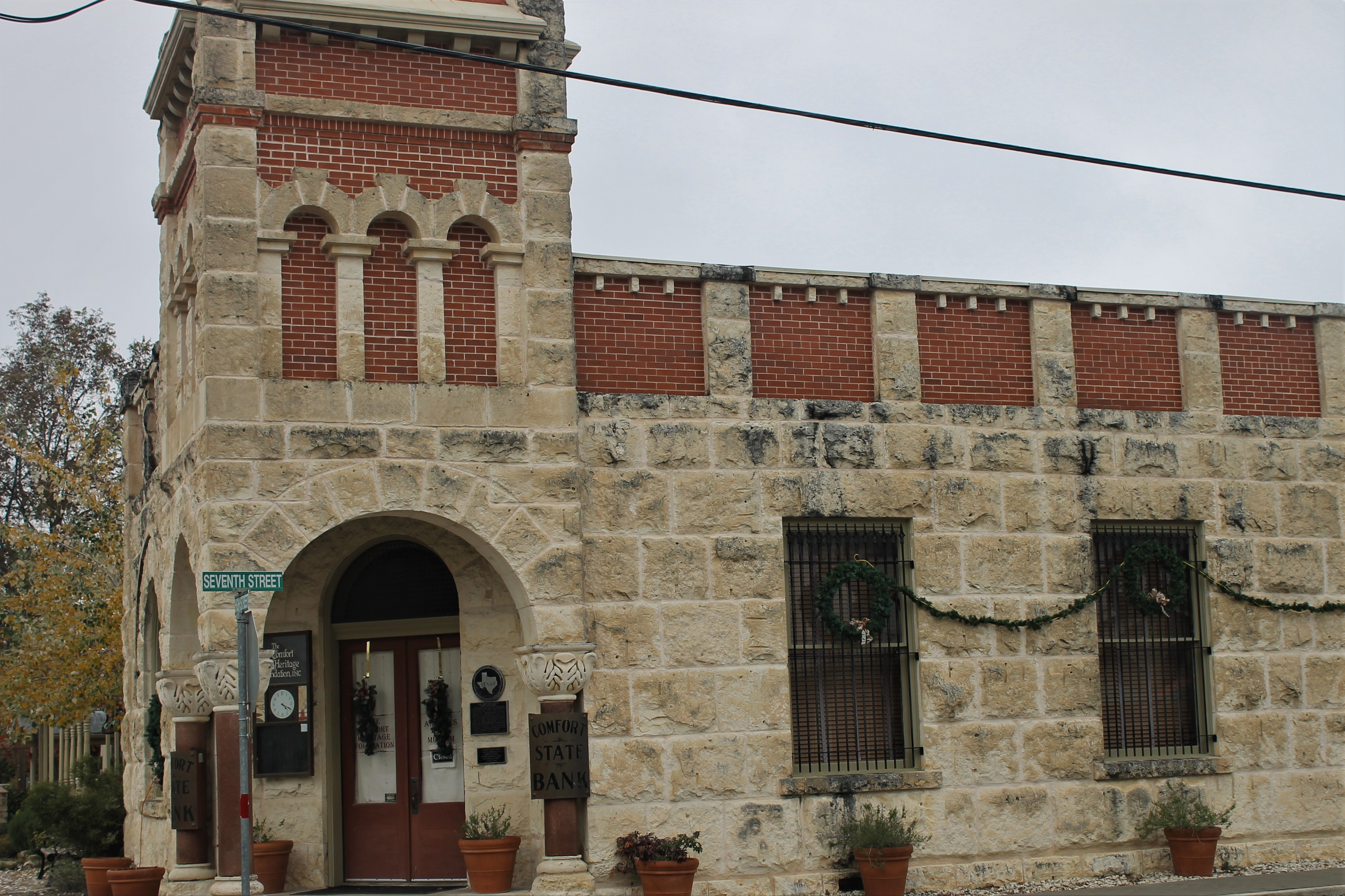
Former Comfort State Bank, now the Comfort Heritage Foundation

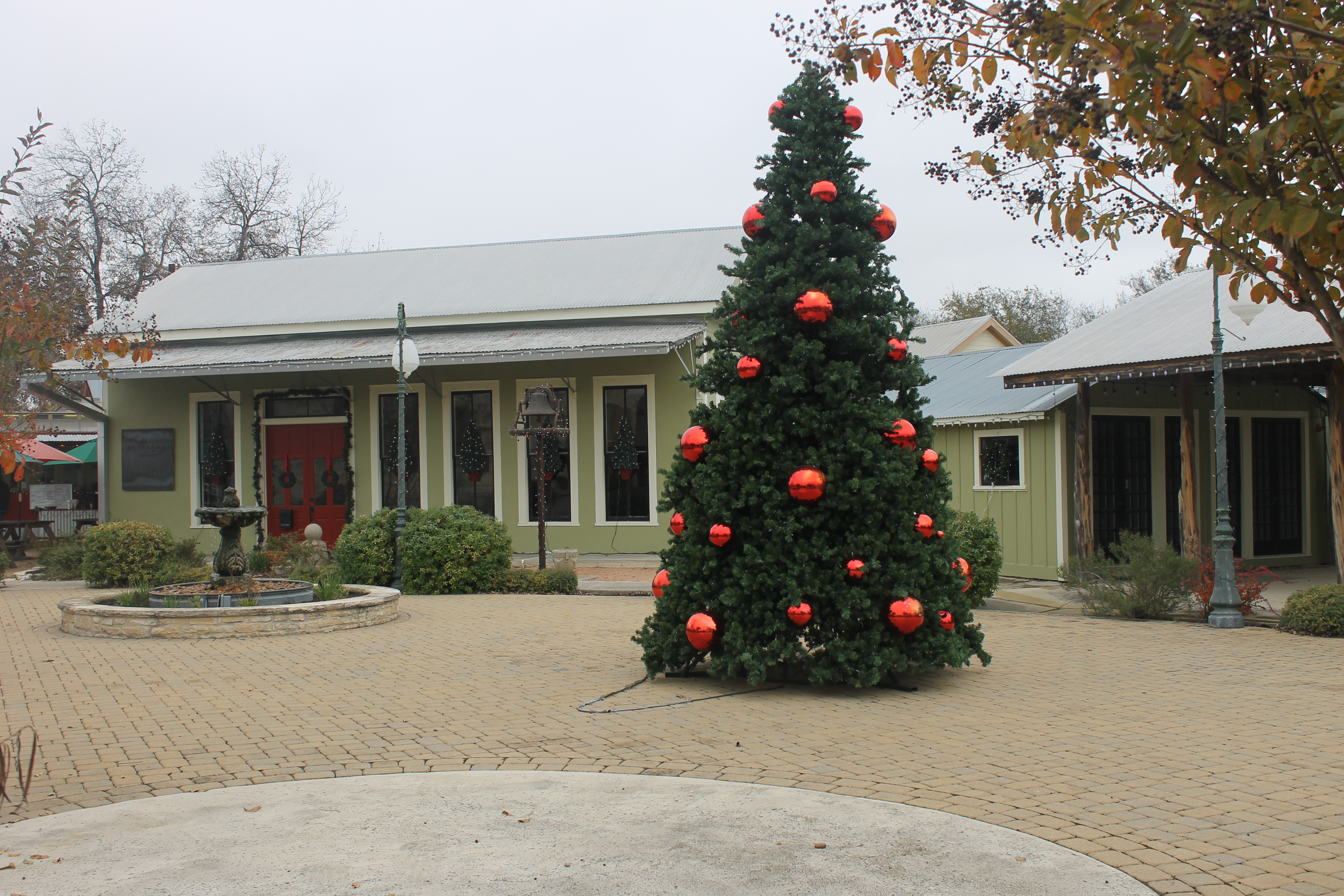
The town square at Christmas

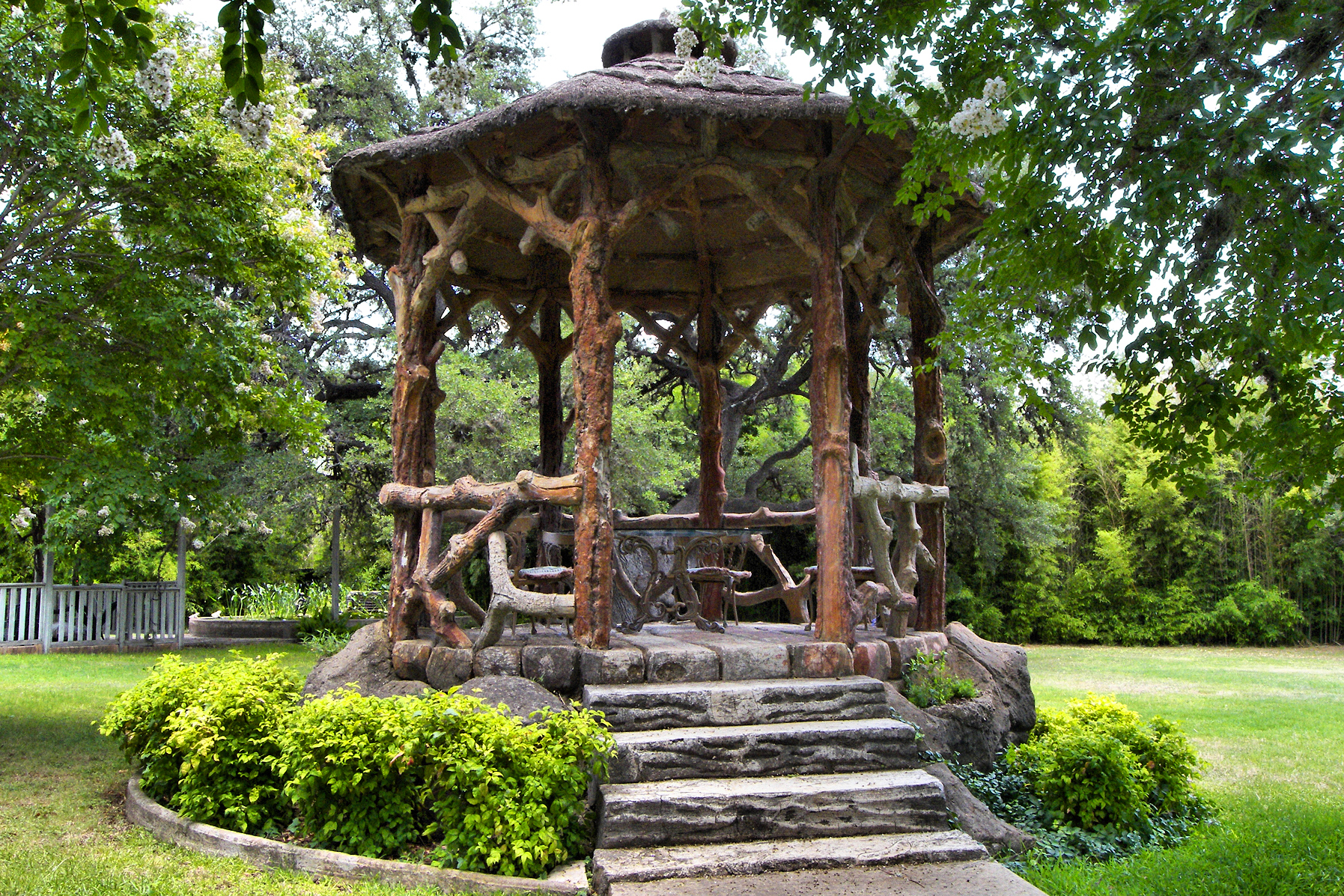
Gazebo for Albert Steves designed by Dionicio Rodriguez

Comfort was established in 1854 by German immigrants, who were Freethinkers and abolitionists. Ernst Hermann Altgelt, at the age of 22, is credited with surveying and measuring the lots that were later sold to the incoming Germans. He stayed and married Emma (Murck) Altgelt, and they raised their nine children in the township of Comfort. Fritz and Betty Holekamp built the first house in Comfort, having started construction before Comfort's official founding on September 3, 1854. The first churches were not established in Comfort until 1892. After some controversy, a cenotaph honoring "the Founding Freethinkers" was dedicated on November 2, 2002.

The downtown area is possibly one of the most well-preserved historic business districts in Texas. The well over 100 structures in the area date back to the 19th century, and seven of them were designed by noted architect Alfred Giles. Mr. Giles lived in San Antonio and would ride horses, the stagecoach, and later the train to check his building sites in Comfort. Most of the population today is composed of descendants of those original pioneer families of the 1850s and the 1860s.

Comfort is also known for a tragic event that took place during the American Civil War. The Treue der Union Monument ("Loyalty to the Union") was dedicated in honor of 35 men who died at the Battle of the Nueces, which took place because they opposed the state's secession from the Union. The German settlers were killed on their way to Mexico during the Civil War. They were attacked by Confederate forces near Brackettville on August 10, 1862. The bodies were not buried, and the bones were retrieved and placed here in 1865. The monument was erected in 1866.

In 1918, Albert Steves erected a hygieostatic bat roost on his family farm in Comfort. This roost was built to attract bats in an effort to control mosquito populations by natural means. It was originally researched and developed by Dr. Charles Agustus Rosenheimer Campbell of San Antonio. The idea was to use bats against malaria-carrying mosquitos. At one time, 16 bat roosts had been built in the United States and Europe, of which only two sites now remain — one in Comfort and one in the Florida Keys.

=== Darmstadt Society of Forty ===
Some of the early settlers in Comfort migrated from the collapsed Fisher–Miller Land Grant experimental colonies of the Darmstadt Society of Forty.

== Geography ==
Comfort is bordered to the west by Kerr County. It is 18 miles (29 km) southeast of Kerrville, 16 miles (26 km) northwest of Boerne, and 48 miles (77 km) northwest of San Antonio. The town is at the interchange of I-10 and US 87.

According to the United States Census Bureau, the Comfort CDP has a total area of 3.2 square miles (8.4 km^{2}), of which 0.01 sq mi (0.02 km^{2}), or 0.27%, is covered by water. The community sits on the north side of Cypress Creek where it joins the Guadalupe River.

=== Climate ===
The climate in this area is characterized by hot, humid summers and generally mild to cool winters. According to the Köppen climate classification, Comfort has a humid subtropical climate, Cfa on climate maps.

== Demographics ==
Historical population
Census	Pop.	Note	%±
1980	1,226		—
1990	1,477		20.5%
2000	2,358		59.6%
2010	2,363		0.2%
2020	2,211		−6.4%
U.S. Decennial Census; 1850–1900 1910; 1920 1930 1940; 1950 1960 1970; 1980 1990 2000; 2010

Comfort was first listed as a census designated place in the 1980 United States census.

=== Racial and ethnic composition ===
Comfort CDP, Texas – Racial and ethnic composition Note: the US Census treats Hispanic/Latino as an ethnic category. This table excludes Latinos from the racial categories and assigns them to a separate category. Hispanics/Latinos may be of any race.
Race / Ethnicity (NH = Non-Hispanic)	Pop 2000	Pop 2010	Pop 2020	% 2000	% 2010	% 2020
White alone (NH)	1,263	1,039	972	53.56%	43.97%	43.96%
Black or African American alone (NH)	4	5	9	0.17%	0.21%	0.41%
Native American or Alaska Native alone (NH)	16	15	18	0.68%	0.63%	0.81%
Asian alone (NH)	2	3	2	0.08%	0.13%	0.09%
Native Hawaiian or Pacific Islander alone (NH)	1	1	0	0.04%	0.04%	0.00%
Other race alone (NH)	0	1	13	0.00%	0.04%	0.59%
Multiracial (NH)	11	13	54	0.47%	0.55%	2.44%
Hispanic or Latino (any race)	1,061	1,286	1,143	45.00%	54.42%	51.70%
Total	2,358	2,363	2,211	100.00%	100.00%	100.00%

=== 2020 census ===
As of the 2020 census, Comfort had a population of 2,211. The median age was 41.7 years. 22.3% of residents were under the age of 18 and 20.9% of residents were 65 years of age or older. For every 100 females there were 90.8 males, and for every 100 females age 18 and over there were 90.8 males age 18 and over.

0.0% of residents lived in urban areas, while 100.0% lived in rural areas.

There were 840 households in Comfort, of which 27.9% had children under the age of 18 living in them. Of all households, 48.3% were married-couple households, 17.5% were households with a male householder and no spouse or partner present, and 28.5% were households with a female householder and no spouse or partner present. About 30.5% of all households were made up of individuals and 15.5% had someone living alone who was 65 years of age or older.

There were 971 housing units, of which 13.5% were vacant. The homeowner vacancy rate was 2.3% and the rental vacancy rate was 9.4%.

=== 2000 census ===
As of the 2000 census,2,358 people, 799 households, and 603 families lived in the CDP. The population density was 735.6 inhabitants per square mile (284.0/km^{2}). The 917 housing units had an average density of 286.1 per square mile (110.5/km^{2}). The racial makeup of the CDP was 76.34% White, 0.51% African American, 1.19% Native American] 0.13% Asian, 0.21% Pacific Islander, 18.70% from other races, and 2.93% from two or more races. Hispanics or Latinos of any race were 45.00% of the population.

Of the 799 households, 38.0% had children under 18 living with them, 59.7% were married couples living together, 11.5% had a female householder with no husband present, and 24.5% were not families. About 20.5% of all households were made up of individuals, and 9.3% had someone living alone who was 65 or older. The average household size was 2.82 and the average family size was 3.26.

In the CDP, the age distribution was 29.3% under 18, 10.7% from 18 to 24, 25.5% from 25 to 44, 20.1% from 45 to 64, and 14.3% who were 65 or older. The median age was 33 years. For every 100 females, there were 94.7 males. For every 100 females 18 and over, there were 89.5 males.

The median income for a household in the CDP was $28,799 and for a family was $29,295. Males had a median income of $20,972 versus $15,000 for females. The per capita income for the CDP was $12,687. About 27.1% of families and 29.0% of the population were below the poverty line, including 39.2% of those under 18 and 3.3% of those 65 or over.

== Education ==
Comfort is served by the Comfort Independent School District.

== Notable people ==
- Catherine Caradja (1893–1993), Romanian aristocrat and philanthropist, maintained a residence in Comfort.
- Betty Holekamp (1826–1902), Texas pioneer, was called the Betsy Ross of Texas.

== See also ==
- July 2025 Central Texas floods
