= Boerne, Texas =

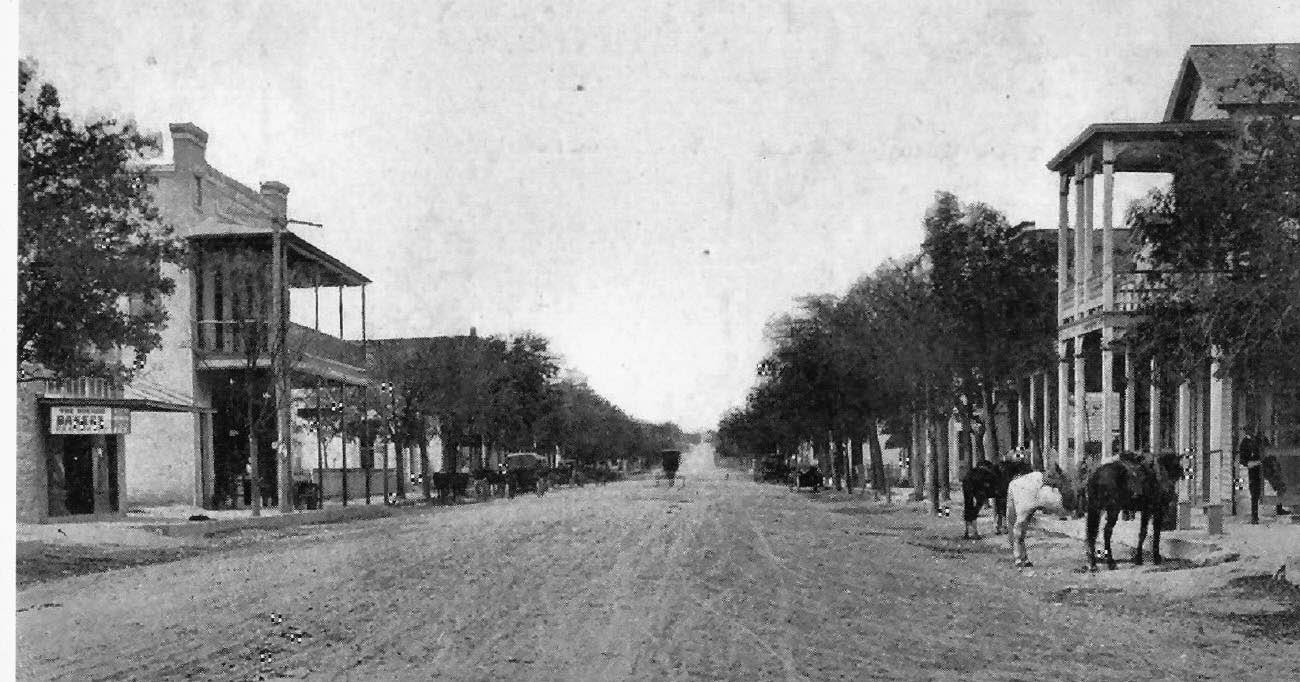
- Main Street in Boerne, Texas, c.1890-1900
- Interactive map of Boerne, Texas
- Coordinates: 29°47′45″N 98°43′56″W
- Country: United States
- State: Texas
- County: Kendall
- Settled: 1849

Government
  - Type: Council–manager
  - City council: Mayor Frank Ritchie; Ty Wolosin; Joe Bateman; Quinten Scott; Bret Bunker; Joseph Macaluso
  - City manager: Ben Thatcher

Area
  - Total: 11.98 sq mi (31.02 km^{2})
  - Land: 11.67 sq mi (30.23 km^{2})
  - Water: 0.31 sq mi (0.79 km^{2})
- Elevation: 1,447 ft (441 m)

Population (2020)
  - Total: 17,850
  - Estimate (2025): 24,047
  - Density: 1,529/sq mi (590.5/km^{2})
- Time zone: UTC-6 (Central)
  - Summer (DST): UTC-5 (Central)
- ZIP codes: 78006, 78015
- Area code: 830
- GNIS feature ID: 2409874
- FIPS code: 48-09160
- Website: www.ci.boerne.tx.us

Boerne (/ˈbɜːrni/ BURN-ee) is a city in and the county seat of Kendall County, Texas, United States, in the Texas Hill Country. Founded in 1849 as Tusculum, German settlers changed its name to Boerne, in honor of author and satirist Ludwig Börne, when it was platted in 1852. Boerne is known for its German-Texan history. Its population was 10,471 at the 2010 census, and in 2020 the population was 17,850. Boerne is part of the San Antonio–New Braunfels metropolitan statistical area. The city is noted for the landmark U.S. Supreme Court case City of Boerne v. Flores.

== History ==
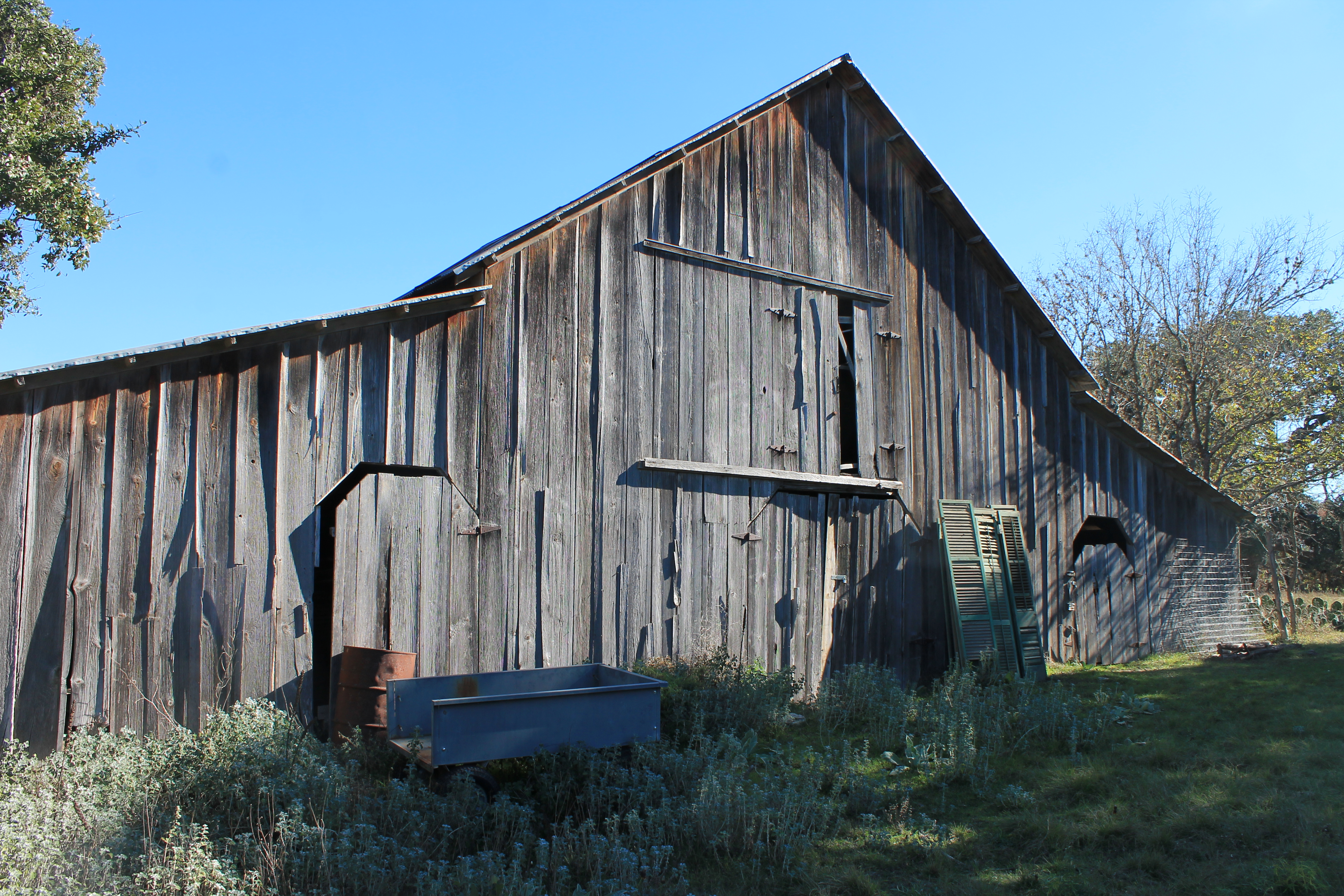
A barn on the Herff–Rozelle Farm is a reminder of Boerne's agricultural past.

Boerne came into being as an offshoot of the Texas Hill Country Free Thinker Latin Settlements, resulting from the Revolutions of 1848 in the German states. Those who came were Forty-Eighters, intellectual liberal abolitionists who enjoyed conversing in Latin and who believed in utopian ideals that guaranteed basic human rights to all. They reveled in passionate conversations about science, philosophy, literature, and music. The Free Thinkers first settled Castell, Bettina, Leningen, and Schoenburg in Llano County. These experimental communities were supported for one year by the Adelsverein, a group of German nobles. The communities eventually failed due to lack of finances after the Adelsverein funding expired, and also due to conflicts of structure and authority. Many of the pioneers from these communities moved to Sisterdale, Boerne, and Comfort.

In 1849, a group of Free Thinker German colonists from Bettina camped on the north side of Cibolo Creek, about a mile west of the site of present Boerne. They named their new community after Cicero's Tusculum home in ancient Rome. In 1852, surveyor John James and businessman Gustav Theissen, who had helped settle Sisterdale, platted the townsite, renamed it in honor of German author Karl Ludwig Börne, (with the Anglicized spelling of "Boerne") and sold off the platted lots. The town was not incorporated until 1909. August Staffell was the original postmaster in 1856. Early businesses in Boerne included a sawmill/gristmill, blacksmith shop and meat market.

Karl Dienger organized the Boerne Gesang Verein (singing club) and the Boerne Village Band in 1860. The family and descendants of Sisterdale resident Baron Ottomar von Behr have included three generations of directors of the Boerne Village Band, and four generations of musicians. The band is billed as the "Oldest Continuously Organized German Band in the World outside Germany", and in 1998 the Federal Republic of Germany recognized the Boerne Village Band for its contribution to the German heritage in Texas and America.

During the Civil War, Boerne voted against secession and was a mostly pro-Union town; many communities in Kendall County were part of the formation of the Union League, which supported the Union and Abraham Lincoln.

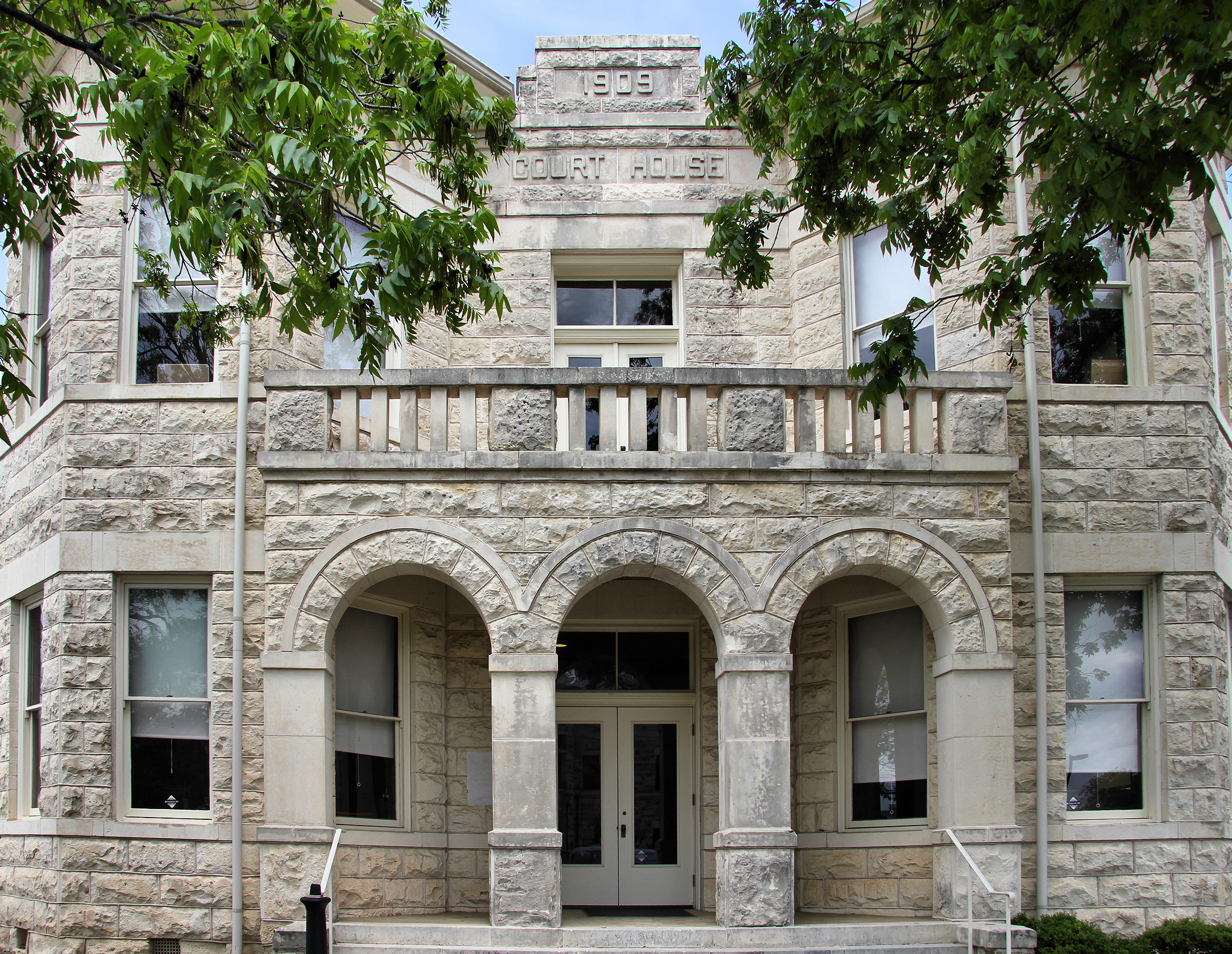
The historic Kendall County Courthouse in Boerne.

The 1870 limestone courthouse, second-oldest in Texas, was designed by architects Philip Zoeller and J. F. Stendebach, and stands directly across the street from the current 1998 courthouse designed by architects Rehler, Vaughn & Koone, Inc.

In the 1870s and 1880s, immigrants from England began arriving in the Texas Hill Country. In the late 1870s, retired British army officers, including Glynn Turquand and Captain Egremont Shearburn, played one of the first polo matches in the United States in Boerne. The polo ground is still visible on Balcones Ranch, bought by Captain Turquand in 1878.

In March 1887, the San Antonio and Aransas Pass Railway came to town. The coming of the railroad was an economic boost of some magnitude, and it created better conditions for the area.

Boerne's robust environment encouraged the health resort industry. Sisters of the Incarnate Word founded the St. Mary's Sanitarium in 1896 for pulmonary patients; Dr. W.E. Wright contracted with the Veterans Administration in 1919 to provide care for World War I veterans suffering from lung ailments; the William L. Sill Tuberculosis Resort operated northwest of Boerne; and Mrs. Adolph (Emilie) Lex opened her home to recovering patients, eventually converting two rooms into operating rooms.

When incorporated in 1909, Boerne was a general-law municipality with a mayor-alderman form of government. In an election in November 1995, the citizens voted to have Boerne become a home rule city with a council-manager plan of government.

The arrival of the boll weevil, World War I, the Great Depression and World War II all contributed to decades of economic decline in Boerne. The arrival of Interstate 10 around 1966 finally started an economic recovery.

== Geography ==
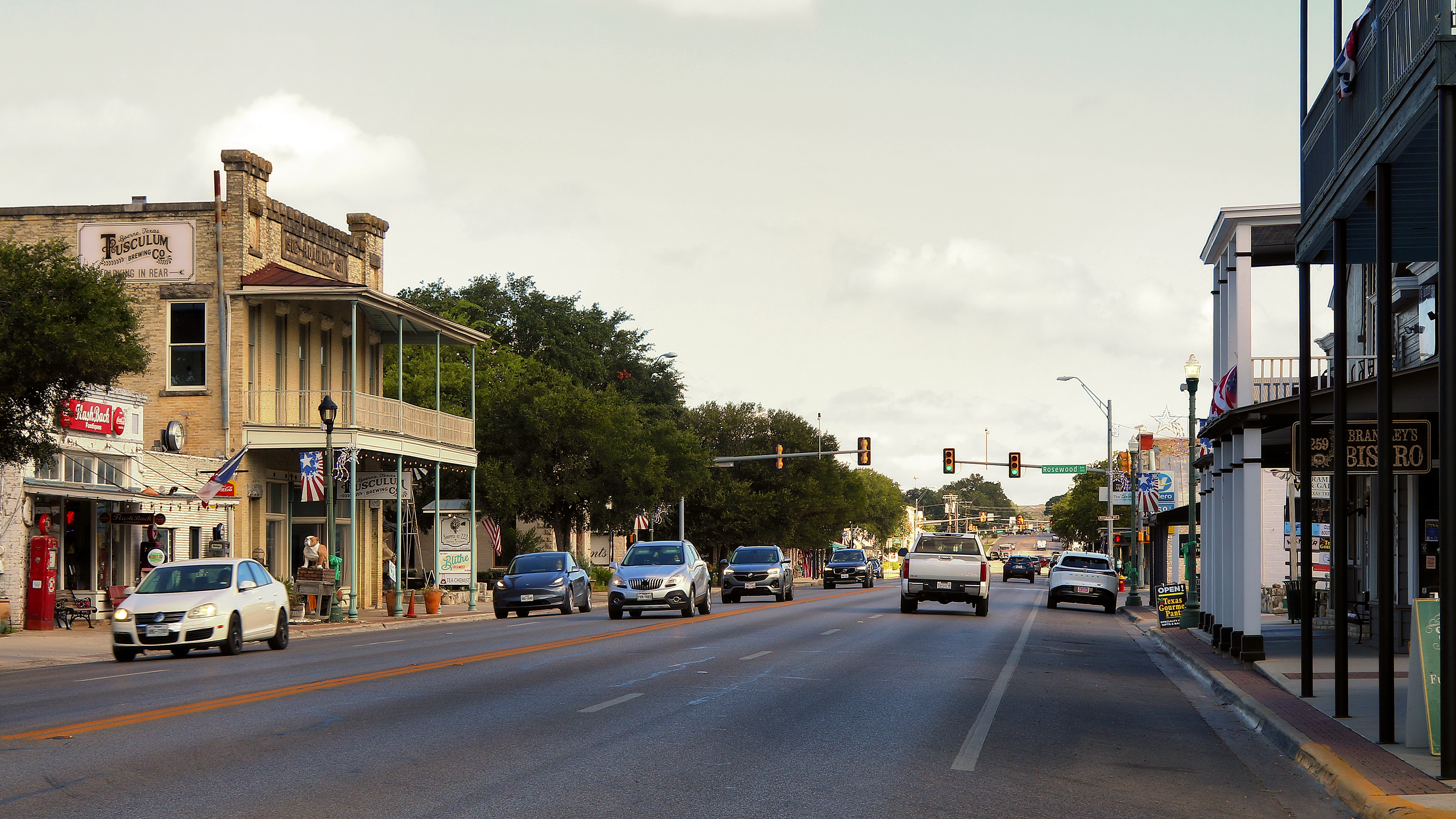
Business 87 through downtown Boerne.

Boerne is located in southern Kendall County in the Texas Hill Country. Interstate 10 and U.S. Route 87 pass through the city south and west of its center, with access from Exits 537 through 543. I-10/US-87 lead southeast 31 miles (50 km) to downtown San Antonio and northwest 16 miles (26 km) to Comfort, where the highways diverge.

According to the United States Census Bureau, Boerne has a total area of 11.6 square miles (30.1 km^{2}), of which 0.3 square miles (0.8 km^{2}), or 2.61%, is covered by water. Cibolo Creek, a 96-mile-long (154 km) tributary of the San Antonio River, flows through the city.

Two of Texas' seven show caves are located near Boerne: Cave Without a Name is 10 miles (16 km) to the northeast, and Cascade Caverns are 3 miles (5 km) to the southeast. They are both actively growing limestone-solution caves.

=== Climate ===
Boerne has a typical central Texas humid subtropical climate (Köppen: Cfa) with hot, frequently humid summers and winters that average mild, but vary from hot to cold. Although 46.1 mornings per year fall below freezing, snowfall is extremely rare: between 1971 and 2000, the median was zero and the mean 0.5 inches or 0.013 metres. Temperatures at or below 0 °F or −17.8 °C have occurred only three times on record: December 22, 1929, January 31, 1949, and February 2, 1951, with the second being the coldest at −4 °F or −20 °C. In contrast to these cold spells, February 20 and 21, 1986, both reached 94 °F (34.4 °C), February 21 to 24, 1996 had four successive afternoons over 93 °F (33.9 °C), and January 1943 had three days reach 86 °F or 30 °C. The absolute hottest temperature has been 112 °F or 44.4 °C on August 23, 1925.

Summer weather is very hot, and can be either dry or humid: 91.6 afternoons reach above 90 °F or 32.2 °C, although only 3.6 afternoons reach 100 °F or 37.8 °C. Mostly the summer months are dry as the region is too far east of the monsoonal trough, but remnants of hurricanes tracking inland can produce very heavy rainfall, indeed, as in the wettest month of July 2002 when 28.43 inches (722.1 mm) fell and the first five days as much as 25.47 inches or 646.9 millimetres. The wettest days in Boerne have been October 2, 1913, with 9.04 inches (229.6 mm) and June 22, 1997, with 8.93 inches (226.8 mm). In contrast, no rain fell between June 27 and August 31 of 1993, with only 1.45 inches or 36.8 millimetres between June and August 1910. Winter rain usually occurs via Pacific storms redeveloping over the Gulf of Mexico and directing a moist southeasterly flow; in the extreme case of the winter of 1991/1992, 14.42 inches or 366.3 millimetres fell between December 19 and 22, with a total of 29.44 inches (747.8 mm) for the three winter months; however, four years later, the whole winter had no more than 0.96 inches (24.4 mm). Overall, the wettest calendar year has been 1992 with 64.17 inches (1,629.9 mm) and the driest 1954 with 10.29 inches (261.4 mm), although between July 1991 and June 1992 68.13 inches (1,730.5 mm) were recorded.

Climate data for Boerne, Texas (1991–2020 normals, extremes 1898–present)
Month	Jan	Feb	Mar	Apr	May	Jun	Jul	Aug	Sep	Oct	Nov	Dec	Year
Record high °F (°C)	90 (32)	98 (37)	99 (37)	100 (38)	104 (40)	105 (41)	109 (43)	112 (44)	109 (43)	98 (37)	95 (35)	92 (33)	112 (44)
Mean maximum °F (°C)	78.8 (26.0)	82.8 (28.2)	87.2 (30.7)	90.2 (32.3)	93.1 (33.9)	96.4 (35.8)	98.2 (36.8)	100.0 (37.8)	97.1 (36.2)	91.5 (33.1)	83.9 (28.8)	78.9 (26.1)	101.2 (38.4)
Mean daily maximum °F (°C)	61.5 (16.4)	65.5 (18.6)	72.1 (22.3)	78.8 (26.0)	84.0 (28.9)	89.8 (32.1)	92.5 (33.6)	94.1 (34.5)	88.5 (31.4)	80.5 (26.9)	70.0 (21.1)	62.7 (17.1)	78.3 (25.7)
Daily mean °F (°C)	49.0 (9.4)	53.0 (11.7)	59.6 (15.3)	66.3 (19.1)	73.3 (22.9)	79.4 (26.3)	81.8 (27.7)	82.3 (27.9)	76.8 (24.9)	68.0 (20.0)	57.7 (14.3)	50.3 (10.2)	66.5 (19.2)
Mean daily minimum °F (°C)	36.6 (2.6)	40.5 (4.7)	47.2 (8.4)	53.8 (12.1)	62.7 (17.1)	69.0 (20.6)	71.0 (21.7)	70.5 (21.4)	65.1 (18.4)	55.6 (13.1)	45.4 (7.4)	38.0 (3.3)	54.6 (12.6)
Mean minimum °F (°C)	21.2 (−6.0)	24.3 (−4.3)	27.9 (−2.3)	36.0 (2.2)	46.2 (7.9)	59.2 (15.1)	65.2 (18.4)	63.3 (17.4)	51.0 (10.6)	36.5 (2.5)	27.5 (−2.5)	22.6 (−5.2)	18.4 (−7.6)
Record low °F (°C)	−4 (−20)	−1 (−18)	14 (−10)	25 (−4)	34 (1)	44 (7)	54 (12)	51 (11)	35 (2)	21 (−6)	14 (−10)	0 (−18)	−4 (−20)
Average precipitation inches (mm)	2.28 (58)	2.22 (56)	2.79 (71)	2.52 (64)	5.28 (134)	3.78 (96)	2.83 (72)	2.80 (71)	3.90 (99)	3.88 (99)	2.92 (74)	2.32 (59)	37.52 (953)
Average snowfall inches (cm)	0.0 (0.0)	0.0 (0.0)	0.0 (0.0)	0.0 (0.0)	0.0 (0.0)	0.0 (0.0)	0.0 (0.0)	0.0 (0.0)	0.0 (0.0)	0.0 (0.0)	0.0 (0.0)	0.1 (0.25)	0.1 (0.25)
Average precipitation days (≥ 0.01 in)	6.8	7.2	7.9	5.9	8.2	6.6	4.8	4.6	7.2	6.5	6.8	6.7	79.2
Average snowy days (≥ 0.1 in)	0.0	0.0	0.0	0.0	0.0	0.0	0.0	0.0	0.0	0.0	0.0	0.0	0.0
Source: NOAA

== Demographics ==
Historical population
Census	Pop.	Note	%±
1870	250		—
1880	346		38.4%
1890	433		25.1%
1900	800		84.8%
1910	886		10.8%
1920	1,153		30.1%
1930	1,117		−3.1%
1940	1,271		13.8%
1950	1,802		41.8%
1960	2,169		20.4%
1970	2,432		12.1%
1980	3,229		32.8%
1990	4,274		32.4%
2000	6,178		44.5%
2010	10,471		69.5%
2020	17,850		70.5%
2025 (est.)	25,047		40.3%
U.S. Decennial Census

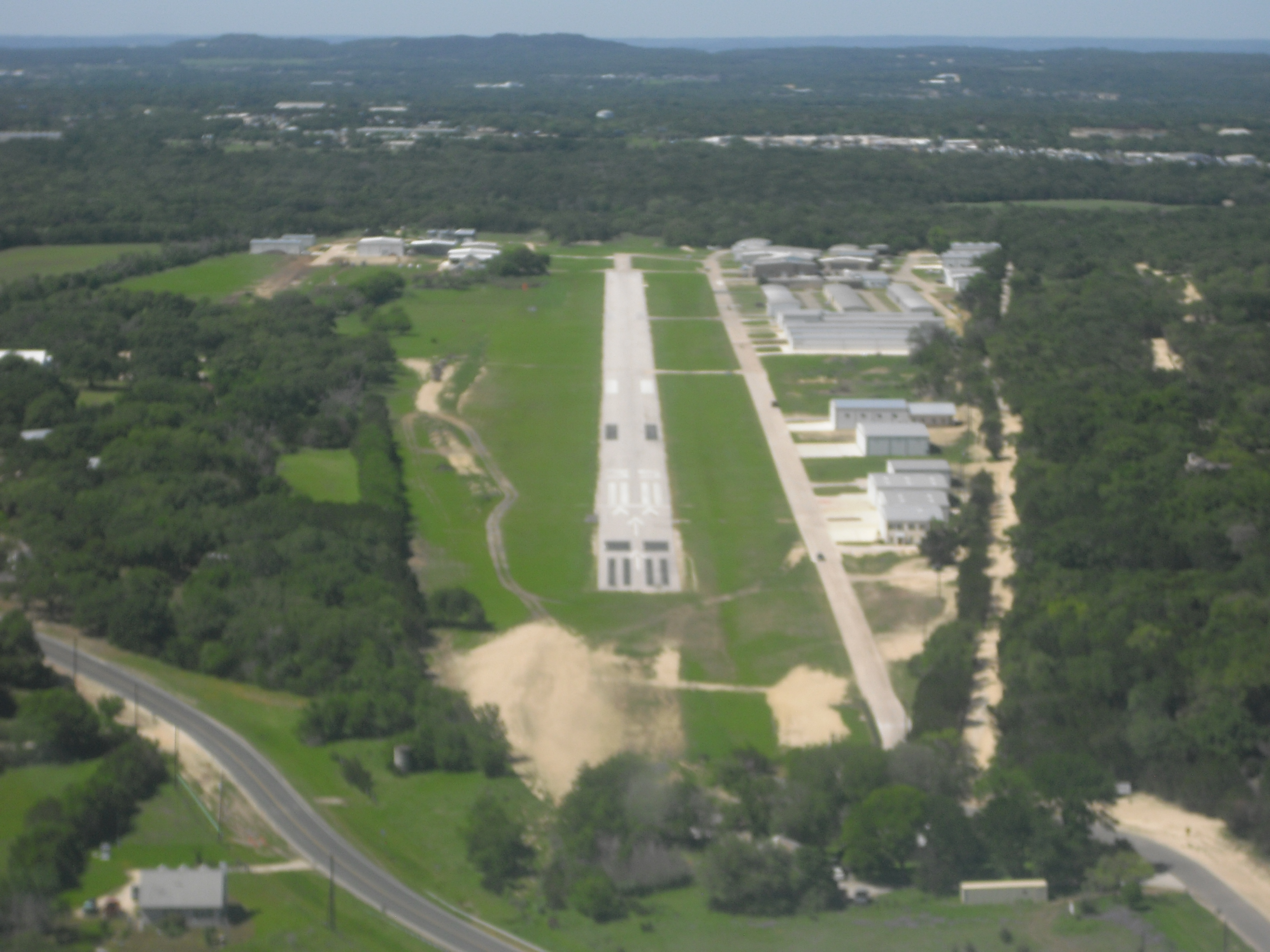
Boerne Stage Airport

=== 2020 census ===
As of the 2020 census, Boerne had a population of 17,850. The median age was 38.5 years. 26.6% of residents were under the age of 18 and 18.9% of residents were 65 years of age or older. For every 100 females there were 90.6 males, and for every 100 females age 18 and over there were 85.7 males age 18 and over.

97.7% of residents lived in urban areas, while 2.3% lived in rural areas.

There were 6,498 households in Boerne, of which 38.7% had children under the age of 18 living in them. Of all households, 53.4% were married-couple households, 13.5% were households with a male householder and no spouse or partner present, and 28.5% were households with a female householder and no spouse or partner present. About 26.7% of all households were made up of individuals and 14.8% had someone living alone who was 65 years of age or older.

There were 7,181 housing units, of which 9.5% were vacant. Among occupied housing units, 59.4% were owner-occupied and 40.6% were renter-occupied. The homeowner vacancy rate was 1.9% and the rental vacancy rate was 8.5%.

Racial composition as of the 2020 census
Race	Percent
White	76.1%
Black or African American	1.1%
American Indian and Alaska Native	0.7%
Asian	1.2%
Native Hawaiian and Other Pacific Islander	0.1%
Some other race	6.3%
Two or more races	14.4%
Hispanic or Latino (of any race)	25.8%

=== 2000 census ===
As of the census of 2000, 6,178 people, 2,292 households, and 1,613 families resided in the city. The population density was 1,061.1 inhabitants per square mile (409.7/km^{2}). The 2,466 housing units averaged 423.5 per square mile (163.6/km^{2}). The racial makeup of the city was 94.76% White, 0.36% African American, 0.37% Native American, 0.16% Asian, 0.02% Pacific Islander, 3.29% from other races, and 1.05% from two or more races. Hispanics or Latinos of any race were 19.44% of the population.

Of the 2,292 households, 36.0% had children under 18 living with them, 57.0% were married couples living together, 10.8% had a female householder with no husband present, and 29.6% were not families. About 25.7% of all households were made up of individuals, and 13.4% had someone living alone who was 65 or older. The average household size was 2.56 and the average family size was 3.10.

In the city, the population was distributed as 26.0% under 18, 6.7% from 18 to 24, 26.7% from 25 to 44, 23.0% from 45 to 64, and 17.6% who were 65 or older. The median age was 39 years. For every 100 females, there were 84.9 males. For every 100 females age 18 and over, there were 80.1 males.

The median income for a household in the city was $80,500 and for a family was $50,903. Males had a median income of $35,039 versus $25,773 for females. The per capita income for the city was $23,251. About 6.5% of families and 9.8% of the population were below the poverty line, including 14.5% of those under age 18 and 7.6% of those age 65 or over.

Boerne is home to two public high schools and one private high school. Students located south of Texas State Highway 46 attend Boerne Samuel V. Champion High School, a 5A high school named after a well-liked administrator for the Boerne Independent School District. Opening in 2008, Samuel V. Champion High School is attended by students who matriculate from Boerne Middle School-South.

Students zoned north of Texas Highway 46 attend Boerne High School. A 4A public high school, Boerne High School is smaller than Champion. Boerne High School is a well-regarded public high school and attended by students who come from Boerne Middle School-North.

Boerne is also home to the Geneva School of Boerne. Unlike Boerne Champion and Boerne High School, Geneva is a private high school with an annual tuition of $11,235. Geneva competes in the Texas Association of Private and Parochial Schools at the 4A level.

== Attractions ==
=== Hill Country Mile ===
Created in the early 2010s, the Hill Country Mile is a 1.1-mile-long (1.8 km) walking path following River Road Park and historic Main Street. The path was created as a catalyst to unify and preserve the rich cultural identity of downtown Boerne. It was also created to increase and foster economic growth through downtown shopping and culture centers.

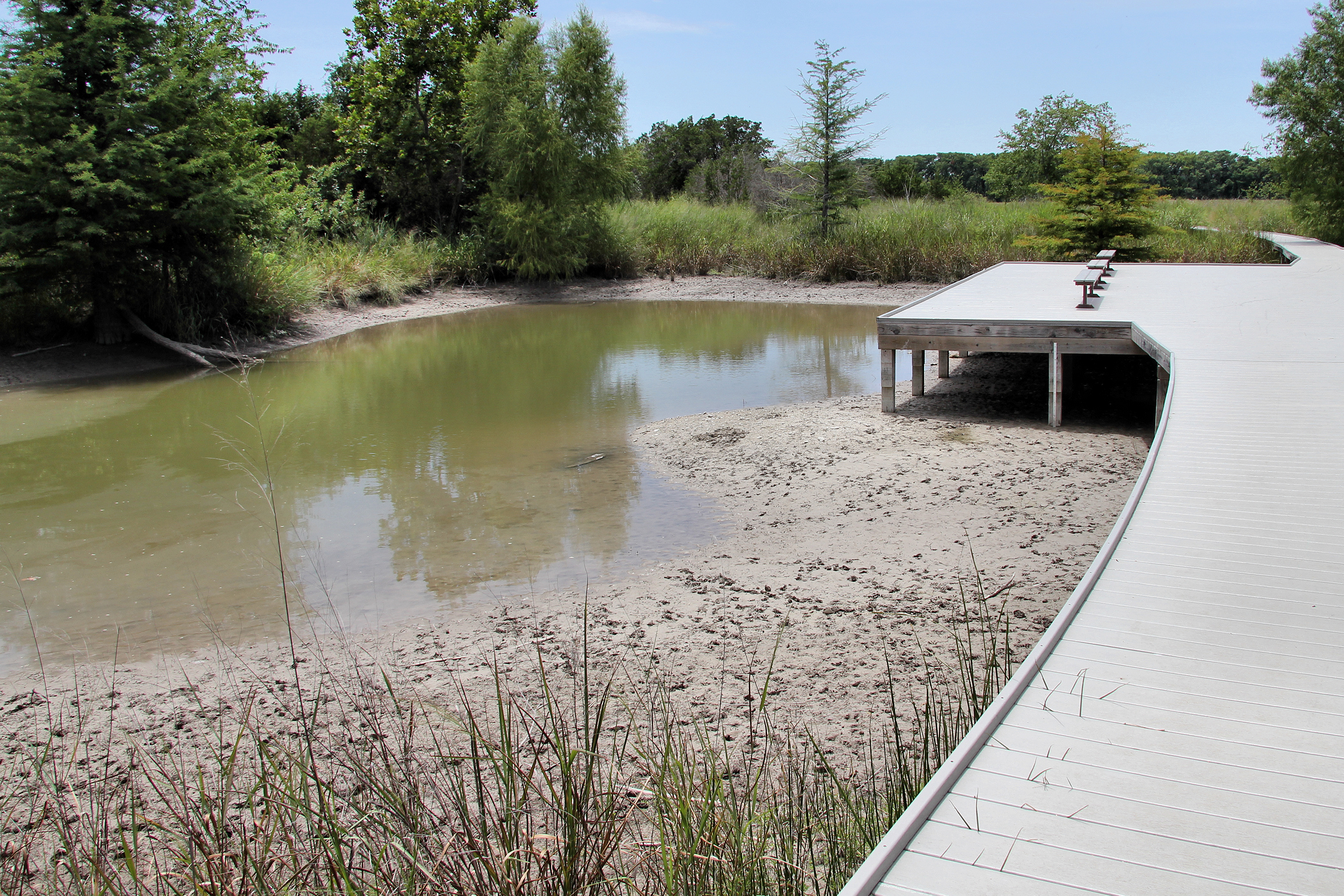
The Marsh Loop Trail Boardwalk at the Cibolo Center for Conservation.

=== Cibolo Center for Conservation ===
The Cibolo Center for Conservation comprises over 100 acres (40 ha) of Hill Country trails and wilderness, as well as the historic Herff-Rozelle Farm. Originally named the Cibolo Nature Center, it was first opened to the public on Earth Day in 1990 after founder Carolyn Chipman Evans urged the City of Boerne to preserve marshland around Boerne City Park. It is maintained through a 501c3 nonprofit organization called the Friends of the Cibolo Wilderness. Trails are open every day from sunrise to sunset, and the Visitors' Center is open from 8am to 5pm. City Park is in a unique natural setting, as it shares a border with Cibolo Creek. The Center features a day camp during the summer for children ages 5–12, which focuses on educating about the environment and learning how to have fun in nature. It also operates a nature-based preschool named The Nest.

=== Boerne City Lake Park ===
Formed by the John D. Reed Dam, Boerne City Lake was completed and opened to the public in 1978. The primary purpose of the project was to provide some flood control for Cibolo Creek, and to supplement the fresh water supply for the city. The lake has around 100 acres of water and an associated watershed of 12,560 acres. Motorized boats are not permitted on the water. As of 2024, the possession and consumption of alcohol at the lake is prohibited.

=== Cascade Caverns ===
Cascade Caverns opened to the public in 1932 and began having private tours in the 1870s. Stories say that the cave was known particularly to the adventurous young men of Kendall County and a hermit, who hid in a cave at the time of the war.

== Education ==
It is in the Boerne Independent School District, which has two high schools, three middle schools, and seven elementary schools. There are also a handful of religious private schools, including the Geneva School of Boerne, as well as Meadowlands, a charter school for at-risk youth in the San Antonio and Hill Country areas.

== Notable people ==
- Michelle Beadle, TV sports personality
- Jacobs Crawley, rodeo world champion
- Ann B. Davis, actress; The Brady Bunch (1969–1974), interred in the Saint Helena's Columbarium and Memorial Gardens
- Bill Goldberg, professional wrestler
- Matt Carriker, American YouTuber, owner of the Demolition Ranch channel
- Herb Hall, jazz clarinet player
- Susan Howard, actress; Dallas (1979–1987)
- George Wilkins Kendall, journalist, Mexican–American War correspondent, and founder of The New Orleans Picayune
- Cheryl Ladd, actress; Charlie's Angels (1977–1981)
- Maggie Lindemann, singer and songwriter
- Grace Phipps, actress; Fright Night (2011), The Nine Lives of Chloe King (2011), The Vampire Diaries (2012), Teen Beach Movie (2013), and Teen Beach 2 (2015)
- Tammie Jo Shults, commercial airline pilot, former Lieutenant commander for the United States Navy Reserve
- George Strait, singer, songwriter, and actor
- Jimmy Walker, PGA Tour golfer
- Matthew O. Williams, Congressional Medal of Honor recipient

== See also ==
- Kendall County Courthouse and Jail
