= Crabapple School (Gillespie County, Texas) =

- U.S. National Register of Historic Places
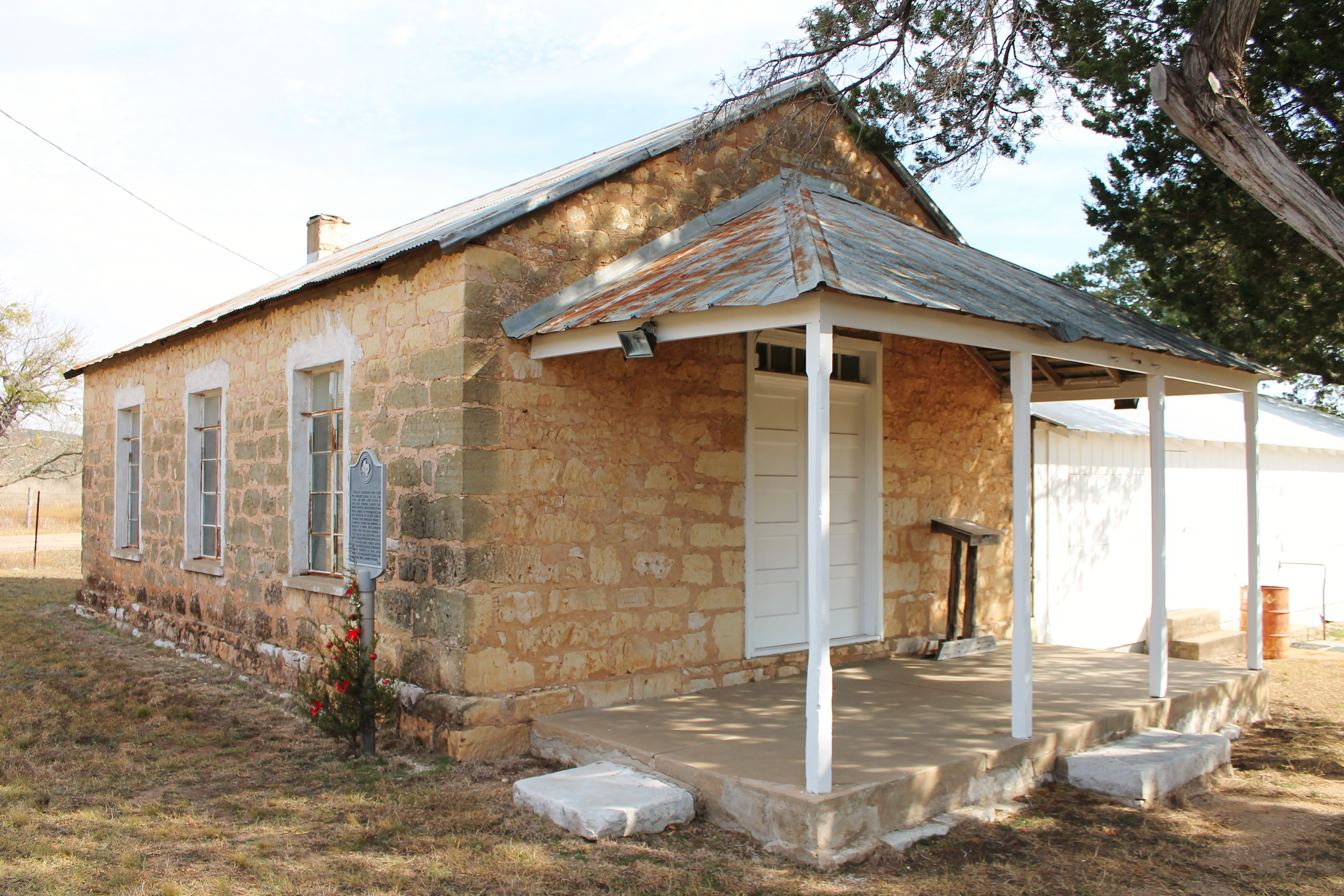
- Crabapple School

- Location within Texas Location within the United States
- Location: 14671 Lower Crabapple Rd, Crabapple, Texas
- Coordinates: 30°26′30″N 98°49′54″W
- Area: 2.8 acres (1.1 ha)
- Built: 1878
- NRHP reference No.: 05000390
- Added to NRHP: May 6, 2005

Crabapple School is located at 14671 Lower Crabapple Road in Gillespie County, in the U.S. state of Texas. It was consolidated with Fredericksburg Independent School District in 1957. The building is now used as a community center. It was added to the National Register of Historic Places listings in Gillespie County, Texas on May 6, 2005.

Farmer Mathias Schmidt donated the land for a Crabapple school, earning the privilege by running a footrace with neighbor Crockett Riley who had also offered to donate land. Area families built the native limestone structure with their own labor. The 1878 school had a single classroom, with an adjoining room for the teacher living quarters. An outer staircase led to a second story storage space. An additional room was added later. A second limestone school was built in 1882 that also served as a Lutheran church, until the St. John's congregation erected its own building in 1887. Twenty-eight teachers taught at Crabapple School before it consolidated with Fredericksburg Independent School District.

The original schoolhouse also served as a post office from 1887–1910. The first postmaster was John J. Stein. There were a total of nine postmasters before the mail was routed to Willow City in 1910.

== See also ==
- National Register of Historic Places listings in Gillespie County, Texas
