= Luckenbach (disambiguation) =

Luckenbach, Germany is a village in the Westerwaldkreis in Rhineland-Palatinate

Luckenbach may also refer to:

- Luckenbach, Texas, an unincorporated community in Gillespie County, known for its association with country music
  - Luckenbach School (Gillespie County, Texas), a Recorded Texas Historic Landmark and on the National Register of Historic Places
- Edgar F. Luckenbach (1868-1943), businessman and owner of the Luckenbach Steamship Company, Inc.
- "Luckenbach, Texas (Back to the Basics of Love)", a country music song
- USS Luckenbach, a number of cargo ships commissioned in the US Navy, incorporating the name Luckenbach
