= Crabapple, Texas =

- Unincorporated community
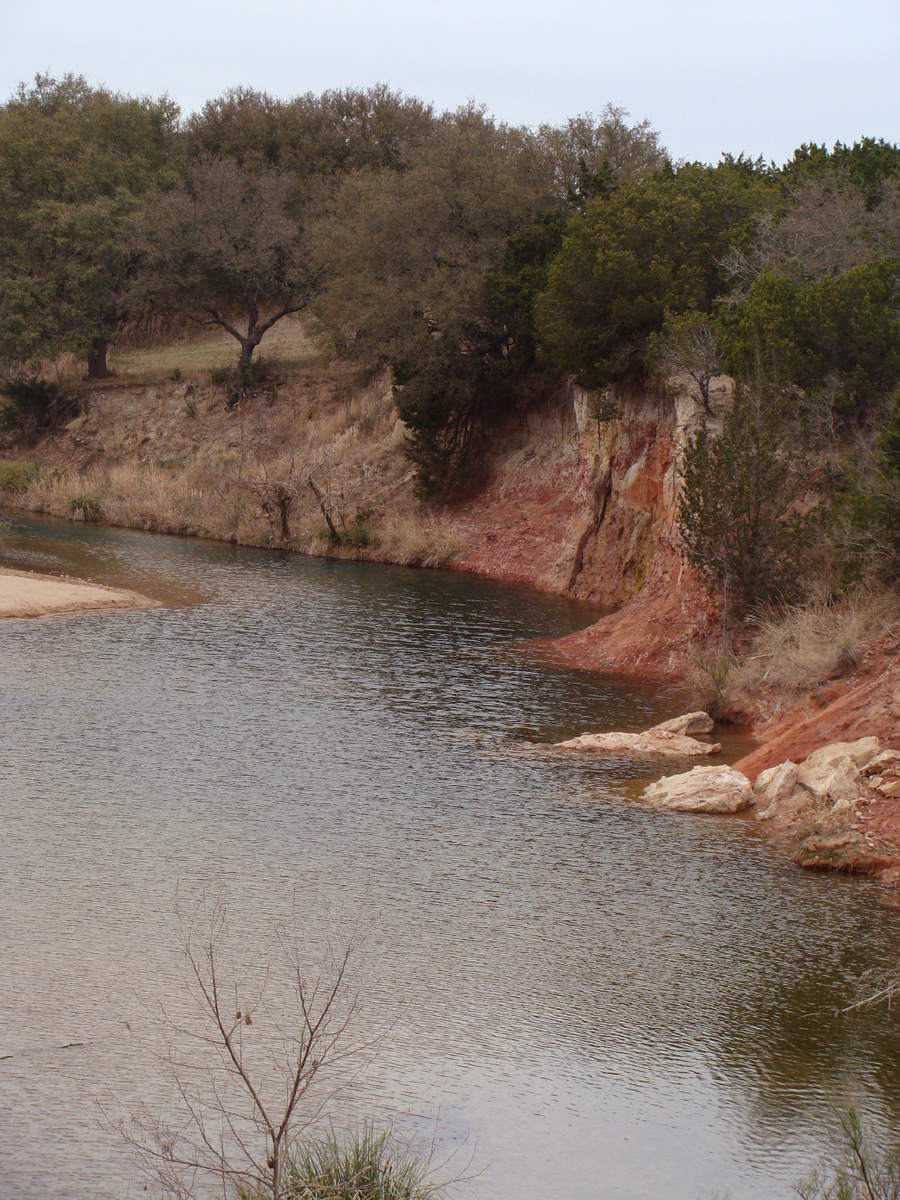
- Crabapple Creek

- Location within the state of Texas Crabapple (the United States)
- Coordinates: 30°26′35″N 98°50′15″W
- Country: United States
- State: Texas
- County: Gillespie
- Elevation: 1,775 ft (541 m)
- Time zone: UTC-6 (Central (CST))
  - Summer (DST): UTC-5 (CDT)
- Area code: 830
- FIPS code
- GNIS feature ID: 1379606

Crabapple is an unincorporated farming and ranching community 10.5 miles (16.9 km) north of Fredericksburg in Gillespie County, Texas, United States, located on Crabapple Creek, about halfway between Fredericksburg and Enchanted Rock State Park at an elevation of 1,775 feet (541 m). Crabapple School was designated a Recorded Texas Historic Landmark in 1994, and added to the National Register of Historic Places in Texas on May 6, 2005.

== Climate ==
The climate in this area is characterized by hot, humid summers and generally mild to cool winters. According to the Köppen Climate Classification system, Crabapple has a humid subtropical climate, abbreviated "Cfa" on climate maps.

== Settlers and community ==
The initial non-indigenous settlers in Crabapple were German immigrants Friedrich Welgehausen, Jacob Land, Adam Pehl, Mathias Schmidt, Nicolaus Rusche, James Riley, Heinrich Kneese, and Jacob and Adam Fries in the mid-19th century.

On December 15, 1847, a petition was submitted to create Gillespie County. In 1848, the legislature formed Gillespie County from Bexar and Travis counties. While the signers were overwhelmingly German immigrants, names also on the petition were Castillo, Pena, Munos, and a handful of non-German Anglo names.

== Crabapple School and post office ==
The original schoolhouse also served as a post office from 1887–1910.

== Balanced Rock ==
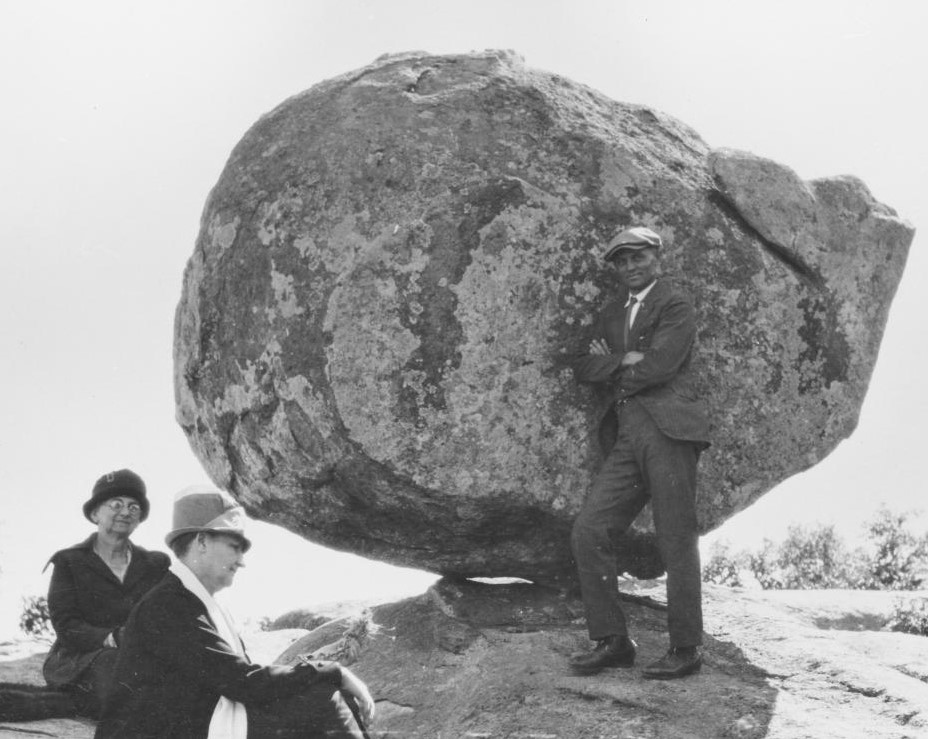
Balanced Rock, Gillespie County, Texas

Balanced Rock was a famous local landmark that perched atop Bear Mountain in Crabapple. The natural stone pillar, about the size of a small elephant, precariously balanced on its small tip. It fell prey to vandals who dynamited it off its base in April 1986.

== See also ==
- Cherry Spring
- Cherry Springs Dance Hall
- Doss
- Enchanted Rock
- Fredericksburg
- Loyal Valley
- Sisterdale
- Texas Hill Country
- Willow City
