= Doss, Gillespie County, Texas =

Doss, Texas
- Unincorporated community
- Location within the state of Texas Doss (the United States)
- Coordinates: 30°26′41″N 99°07′50″W
- Country: United States
- State: Texas
- County: Gillespie
- Elevation: 1,729 ft (527 m)

Population (2000)
  - Total: 225
- Time zone: UTC-6 (Central (CST))
  - Summer (DST): UTC-5 (CDT)
- ZIP code: 78618
- Area code: 830
- FIPS code: 48-20968
- GNIS feature ID: 1379674

Doss is an unincorporated farming and ranching community at the crossroads juncture of FMs 648 and 783 in northwestern Gillespie County, Texas, United States. It is 19 miles northwest of Fredericksburg and 14 miles northeast of Harper. The zip code is 78618. The mean elevation is 1729 feet.

- The U.S. Census for year 2000 showed a total population of 225.
- 1914 Lange's Mill community population was 150.

== History ==
In 1849, the Doss brothers began operating a mill on Threadgill Creek, north of the current site of Doss. The mill was acquired by William F. Lange in 1859, and was operated by him until 1878 when Julius Lange took over the business.. The Doss community originated at the mill. The first post office was at Lange's Mill in 1898, but by 1907 the community was renamed Doss and received its own post office.

=== Lange's Mill Cemetery ===
- F.W. Lange (b 1817 d 1877) is most likely William F. Lange and has two tombstones – an older one in German, and a more modern one that is a joint grave with his wife. There is no William F. Lange in the cemetery
- J. F. Lange (b. 1818 d 1910), née Johanna Freidericke Steines, wife of F.W. She is possibly related to, August Steinesz
- Julius F. Lange (b 1850 d 1926), possibly F.W. Lange's son
- Lena née-Kensing Lange (b 1859 b 1947) wife of Julius
- Adolph Lange (b 1884 d 1884)
- August Steinesz (b 1815 d 1865), also listed as Steiness and Steiner, died only two months after he wed Mary Jackson. No one named Mary is buried in this cemetery
- August Lange (b 1849 d 1921) buried next to wife
- Lina née-Menges Lange (b 1853 d 1928) wife of August Lange
- Balentin Lange (b 1853 d?) no other info – tombstone is in German and badly eroded

== Founding families of Doss, Texas ==
=== Thomas C Doss ===
Sept 8, 1852 Thomas C. Doss was Postmaster of "Fredericksburgh".

The 1860 Gillespie Co Census-Cherry Spring

- 38-year-old Thomas Doss born in Virginia, occupation miller
- 28-year-old Mary born in Arkansas
- 60-year-old William born in Virginia, occupation millwright
- 22-year-old Eckel born in Illinois, occupation miller

LDS Family Research database:

- Thomas C. Doss born 26 March 1822, Fluvanna, Virginia, died 8 June 1873
- Parker S. Doss, father of Thomas C. Doss
- Angelica Epps Cheatham, mother of Thomas C. Doss

Thomas C. Doss final resting place: Der Stadt Friedhof (English translation: The City Cemetery) in Fredericksburg.

=== John E Doss ===
The 1860 Gillespie Co Census-South Grape Creek (Luckenbach):

- 46-year-old John Doss born in Virginia, occupation farmer
- 17-year-old William born in Texas
- 12-year-old Sam born in Texas
- 11-year-old Nanny born in Texas
- 8-year-old Richard born in Texas

LDS Family Research database:

- John E. Doss born 16 February 1812, Fluvanna, Virginia, died "about 1863"
- Parker S. Doss, father of Thomas C. Doss
- Angelica Epps Cheatham, mother of Thomas C. Doss

=== Stonemason Philip Buchmeyer ===
Buchmeyer was the second husband of the widowed Auguste Lehmann and stepfather to her sons Herman and Willie. Both children were kidnapped by Apaches. Willie was released after days, but Herman Lehmann didn't return for 9 years and became the area's most famous Apache captive and later adopted son of Comanche Chief Quanah Parker

== Climate ==
Doss experiences a humid subtropical climate, with hot summers and a generally mild winter. Temperatures range from 81 °F (27.2 C) in the summer to 45 °F (7.2 C) during winter.

Climate data for Doss, Texas
Month	Jan	Feb	Mar	Apr	May	Jun	Jul	Aug	Sep	Oct	Nov	Dec	Year
Record high °F (°C)	88 (31)	100 (38)	98 (37)	100 (38)	105 (41)	108 (42)	107 (42)	109 (43)	108 (42)	100 (38)	92 (33)	98 (37)	109 (43)
Mean daily maximum °F (°C)	60 (16)	65 (18)	73 (23)	80 (27)	85 (29)	91 (33)	95 (35)	94 (34)	89 (32)	80 (27)	70 (21)	61 (16)	79 (26)
Daily mean °F (°C)	45 (7)	50 (10)	57 (14)	65 (18)	72 (22)	79 (26)	82 (28)	81 (27)	76 (24)	66 (19)	56 (13)	47 (8)	65 (18)
Mean daily minimum °F (°C)	31 (−1)	35 (2)	42 (6)	50 (10)	59 (15)	67 (19)	69 (21)	68 (20)	63 (17)	52 (11)	42 (6)	33 (1)	51 (11)
Record low °F (°C)	6 (−14)	3 (−16)	11 (−12)	25 (−4)	36 (2)	46 (8)	54 (12)	51 (11)	36 (2)	26 (−3)	14 (−10)	3 (−16)	3 (−16)
Average precipitation inches (mm)	.91 (23)	1.97 (50)	1.74 (44)	2.05 (52)	3.31 (84)	4 (100)	2 (51)	2.52 (64)	3 (76)	3.01 (76)	2.07 (53)	1.37 (35)	27.95 (708)
Source: The Weather Channel

== Demographics ==
As of the census of 2000 of 2000, there were 225 people

- 98.7% White
- 0.9% Asian
- 0.4% from two or more races
- 46.7% male
- 53.3% female
- 83.1% 18 years or older
- 27.6% 65 years or older
- 62.3% in the labor force
- $35,625 median household income
- $42,917 median family income
- $17,078 per capita income
- 87.2% high school graduate
- 27.8% bachelor's degree or higher
- 13% inactive military veterans
- 17% disabled
- 27.2% language other than English at home
- 3.7% families below poverty level
- 4.7% individuals below poverty level

== Flora and fauna ==
Prickly pear cactus, pecan trees, a variety of oak and mesquite trees, and abundant wildflower varieties blanket the Doss area of Gillespie County.

Doss has farm livestock and the armadillo and Texas horned lizard. The nature lover will also find whitetail deer and birds including spotted towhee, painted bunting, white-crowned sparrow, summer tanager, hummingbird, chickadee, kinglet, goldfinch, warbler, finch and lark sparrow.

== Churches ==
- St. Peter Lutheran Church founded 1896 under leadership of Rev. Hugo G.A. Krienke. 1989 dedicated historical marker by Texas Historical Commission.
- Squaw Creek Primitive Baptist Church constituted 1901 in the Squaw Creek School and Community Building, Elder S. N. Redford, first pastor. 2002 dedicated historical marker by Texas Historical Commission.

== Doss Consolidated Common School District ==
Designated a Recorded Texas Historic Landmark in 1985. from State of Texas states the school was begun in 1884 on Doss-Spring Creek Road. 1894 land for current site was donated by Tom Nixon, and a small frame structure was built. In 1905, a limestone schoolhouse was built, and in 1927 the present building was added.

Doss Elementary School is across the street from St. Peter Lutheran Church. The K-8 grades have 18 students, 48% male and 52% female, and two teachers.

Every year the Doss Public school holds a play performed by the school children. The little room, grades Kindergarten through 4th grade, and the big room, 5th grade through 8th grade, hold plays. The presentation is accompanied by a bake sale and raffle held by the local residents and by the Doss 4H members.

== Doss Volunteer Fire Department ==
Doss VFD Fish Fry annual fundraiser is held Labor Day Weekend.

Almost 3,000 pounds of catfish are fried and served up with homemade potato salad and coleslaw, plus all the trimmings. This benefits the Doss VFD. Entertainment is provided. The Doss Volunteer Fire Department moved into its new Fire Station Building in September 2015 after a year long Building project.

== General store ==
- Doss General Store and Post Office were formerly run under one roof by Fred Itz (1914–2003) and Ruby Oehler Itz (1917–1990).
- Texas Parks and Wildlife magazine has this to say:

Sadly, the Doss store has closed, but the new Doss Country Store, opened in 2001, has become a gathering place for hunters in the area. It has a rock front, and there is a metal roof over the wide, spacious front porch, which is populated with dogs as often as people. Patrons sit on split cedar benches on the porch and watch cattle graze in a field across the town’s main street. Inside, the counter and tables are covered with glass plate, under which old newspaper clippings chronicle local events spanning almost a hundred years.

In 2011 the Doss Country Store was purchased and expanded to include a new feed and hardware store. The new Store and Restaurant have been featured in Texas Monthly for its good food. This also closed in 2014.

== Battle of Iwo Jima re-enactment ==
Welge Ranch in Doss was the site of a re-enactment of Battle of Iwo Jima, sponsored by the National Museum of the Pacific War for the 60th anniversary of the iconic battle. The event was held on February 19, 2005, ending with the famous raising of the flag on Mount Suribachi — which was re-enacted on top of Welge Point in Doss.

== See also ==
- Adelsverein
- Cherry Spring
- Cherry Springs Dance Hall
- Easter Fire
- Enchanted Rock
- German Texan
- Loyal Valley, Texas
- Sisterdale, Texas
- Texas Hill Country
