= Pecan Creek School (Gillespie County, Texas) =

- U.S. National Register of Historic Places
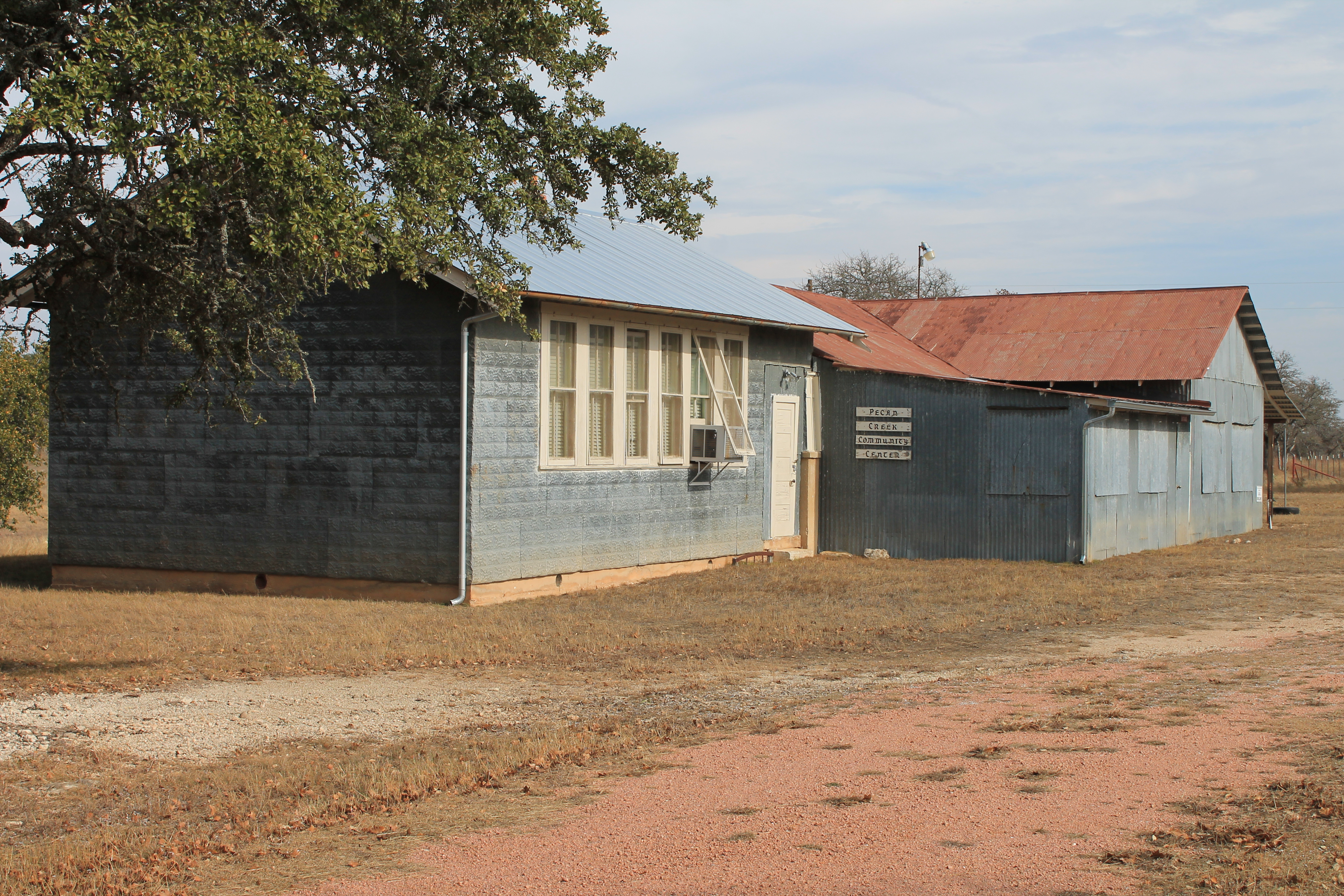
- Pecan Creek School

- Location within Texas Location within the United States
- Location: 3410 Pecan Creek Rd.
- Nearest city: Fredericksburg, Texas
- Coordinates: 30°22′59″N 98°59′42″W
- Area: 3 acres (1.2 ha)
- Built: 1916
- NRHP reference No.: 05000418
- Added to NRHP: May 10, 2005

Pecan Creek School is located at 3410 Pecan Creek Road in Gillespie County, in the U.S. state of Texas. It was consolidated with Fredericksburg Independent School District in 1955. The school was added to the National Register of Historic Places listings in Gillespie County, Texas on May 10, 2005. The Bernhard Friedrich house served as the first school in 1899. Land, materials and labor were donated in 1916 to relocate the structure. Originally a one-room schoolhouse, additional rooms and storage were added as needed. Included in the later additions were a stage and dance floor. The local historical club Friends of Gillespie County Country Schools has restored the building, including original desks and other furnishings. The building is now used as a community center.

== See also ==
- National Register of Historic Places listings in Gillespie County, Texas
