= Morris Ranch, Texas =

- Ghost town
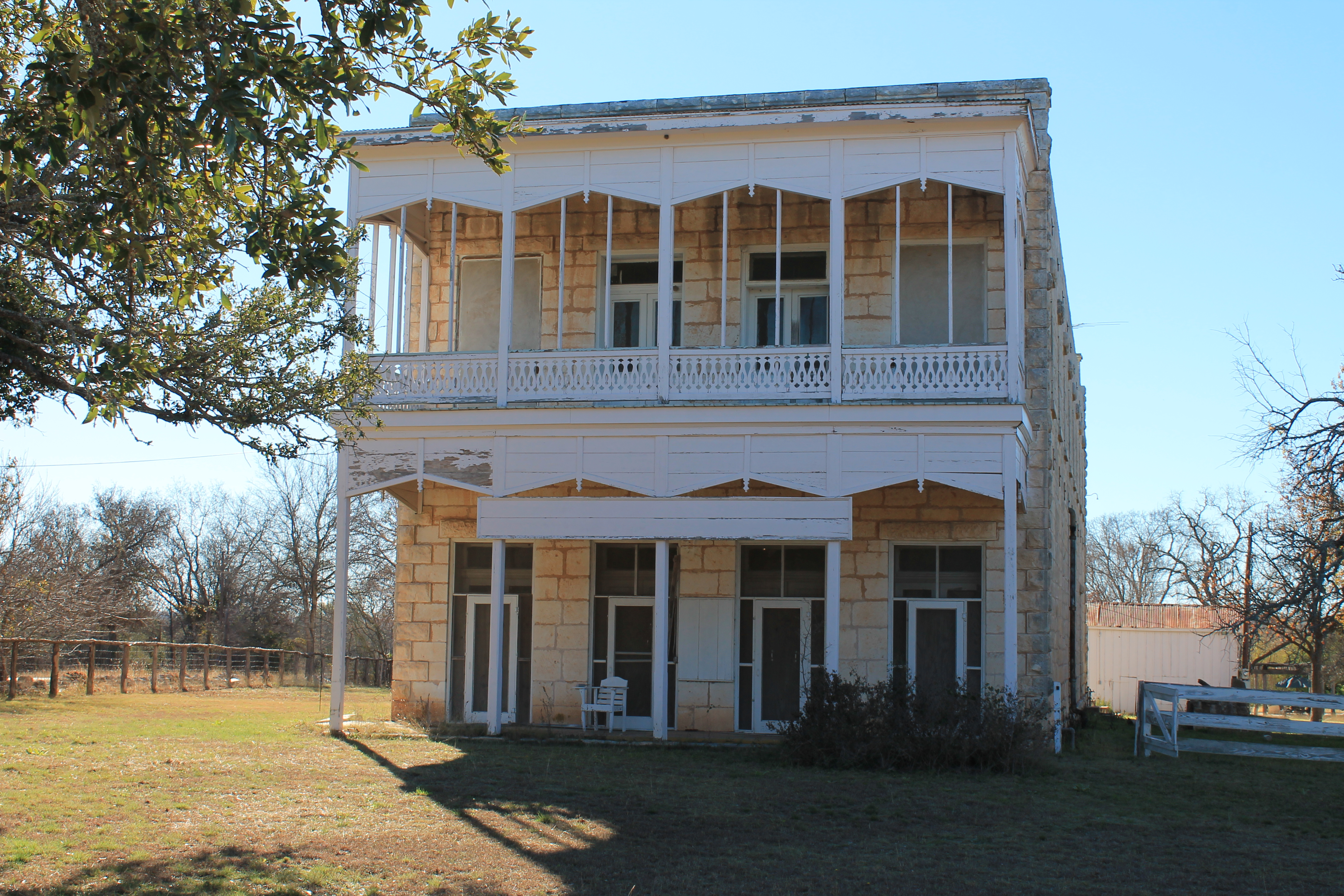
- The old Morris Ranch Hotel

- Location within Texas Location within the United States
- Coordinates: 30°13′02″N 99°00′44″W
- Country: United States
- State: Texas
- County: Gillespie
- Elevation: 1,742 ft (531 m)
- Time zone: UTC−6 (Central (CST))
  - Summer (DST): UTC−5 (CDT)
- Area code: 830
- FIPS code: 48
- GNIS feature ID: 1341940

Morris Ranch is a ghost town, located 8.5 miles (13.7 km) southwest of Fredericksburg in Gillespie County, in the U.S. state of Texas. The area was begun as a thoroughbred horse ranch by New Yorker Francis Morris in 1856, and the town grew up around it. In 1962, the school district was merged with Fredericksburg Independent School District, and the Morris Ranch School ceased operations. The Morris Ranch Schoolhouse was designated a Recorded Texas Historic Landmark in 1980, and added to the National Register of Historic Places listings in Texas, on March 29, 1983.

== Thoroughbred ranch ==
In 1856, New York City broker Francis Morris bought 23,000 acres (93.08 km^{2}; 35.94 sq mi) of land in Gillespie and Kerr counties for twenty-five cents an acre. He eventually sold off all but 16,000 acres (64.75 km^{2}; 25.00 sq mi), and hired his nephew Charles Morris to manage the acreage for horse breeding. Charles was ranch manager until 1910.

Francis Morris died in 1886. The land was inherited by his son John A. Morris, who spent $500,000 on capital improvements and converted the property into a community dedicated to the business of raising thoroughbred horses. The improvements included a hotel for entertaining influential and important individuals, a general store and post office, a school, a cotton gin, and a flour mill. Approximately 200 mares and ten stallions were at the ranch, with yearling colts either being sold or boarded at the Morris stables in Winchester Park, Maryland. Adjacent to the ranch was a racetrack and living quarters for the jockeys, where Hall of Fame Thoroughbred racehorse trainer Max Hirsch got his start.

Anti-gambling legislation passed by in the 1890s by the New Jersey Legislature and the Hart–Agnew Law in 1908 by the New York State Legislature caused the horse racing industry to go into decline, and Morris Ranch along with it. The ranch was inherited by John's sons Alfred and David and eventually by Alfred's son Captain John A. Morris.

== Township ==
Clayton Morris succeeded Charles Morris as manager, and in 1902 sold the horses and subdivided the ranch into tenant cotton farms. Clayton's son Reginald inherited the ranch from his father, but it was no longer a vital business. Although some of the original buildings were still standing in the year 2000, the population began a decline after the subdivision happened. By 1968, no population was listed.

When the Morris Ranch post office opened in 1893, Guy D. Anderson was the first postmaster. He was succeeded by Charles Morris in 1894, who was subsequently succeeded by Clayton Morris in 1910. Clayton Morris served as postmaster until the post office closed in 1954 when the Morris Ranch store was shut down.

The town has been the subject of a ghost story involving the death of Morris Ranch resident Mary Elizabeth Simmons Byrd in 1948.

== Climate ==
The climate in this area is characterized by hot, humid summers and generally mild to cool winters. According to the Köppen climate classification system, Morris Ranch has a humid subtropical climate, abbreviated "Cfa" on climate maps.

== See also ==
- Morris Ranch Schoolhouse, Gillespie County, Texas
- Hart–Agnew Law
