= Rheingold School (Gillespie County, Texas) =

- U.S. National Register of Historic Places
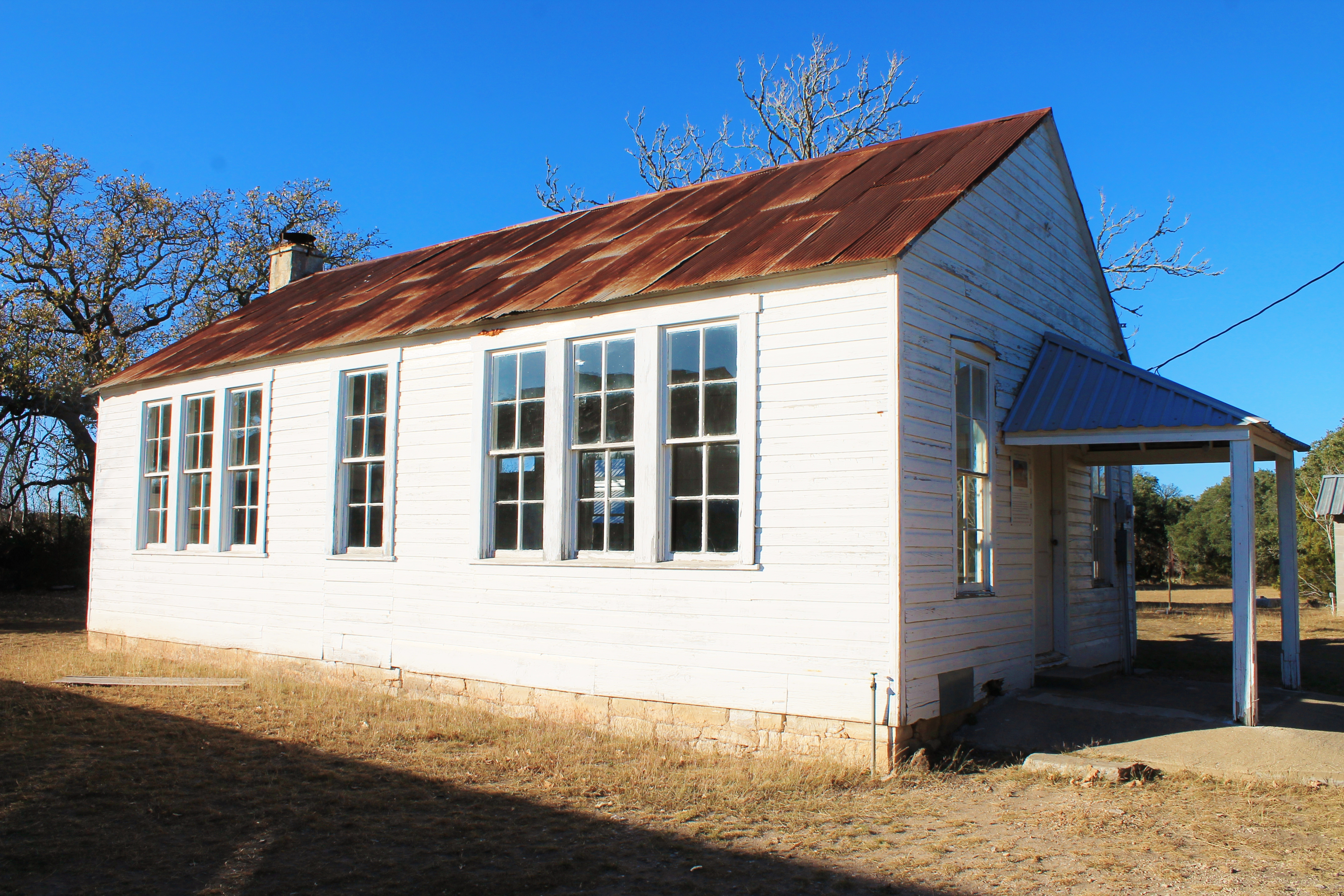
- Rheingold School

- Location within Texas Location within the United States
- Location: 334 Rheingold School Rd., Fredericksburg, Texas
- Coordinates: 30°20′48″N 98°41′14″W
- Area: 5.5 acres (2.2 ha)
- Built: 1873
- NRHP reference No.: 05000388
- Added to NRHP: May 6, 2005

Rheingold School is located at 334 Rheingold School Road, in Gillespie County, Texas. In 1949, the school was consolidated with Fredericksburg Independent School District. The building is now used as a community center. It was added to the National Register of Historic Places in Texas on May 6, 2005.

== Community background ==
The Rheingold community was founded in 1859 on North Grape Creek, 13.5 miles (21.7 km) northeast of Fredericksburg. Colonists included Heinrich Herbert, Gottfried Ottmers, Conrad Bock, Peter Herber, Heinrich Eckhardt, and Peter Fahrenhorst. The settlement became known as Rheingold, because the majority of land and business owners were the widows and sons of German immigrants Jacob and Peter Gold, victims of a cholera epidemic. At one time, Rheingold had a general store, cotton gin, dance hall, blacksmith shop, and a gasoline service station, most of it owned by the Gold family. William Grobe was the postmaster when the community received a post office under the name Rheingold in 1878. The post office continued under the original name of Rheingold until 1907 when the mail service was transferred to Willow City. The original name of Rheingold was officially shortened to Gold when the area received a new post office in 1908. The Gold post office was discontinued in 1931, and the community received its mail from Johnson City.

== School ==
In 1873, William Gold donated 2 acres (0.01 km^{2}; 0.00 sq mi) of land to accommodate the need for a school for the community's children. Labor and materials for the schoolhouse came from area families. The first structure was a 12' x 14' log house. A replacement frame schoolhouse was later built. The school had an indoor wood stove for heat, and separate outhouses for girls and boys. The water supply came from a hand pump in the yard. August Schuchard was the first teacher, who taught grades 1 through 8. The school was tuition free for the first six months, but required a payment of tuition if the student continued to the end of the school year.

The school was consolidated with the Fredericksburg Independent School District in 1949. Rheingold School was added to the National Register of Historic Places in Texas on May 6, 2005. The building is now used as a community center.

== See also ==
- National Register of Historic Places listings in Gillespie County, Texas
