= Meusebach (disambiguation) =

Meusebach is a municipality in Thuringia, Germany.

Meusebach might also refer to:

- John O. Meusebach (1812–1897), a Prussian bureaucrat and American politician
  - Meusebach–Comanche Treaty, between the Penateka Comanche Tribe and German settlers in Texas
- Meusebach Creek School (Gillespie County, Texas)
