= Cherry Spring School (Gillespie County, Texas) =

- U.S. National Register of Historic Places
- Recorded Texas Historic Landmark
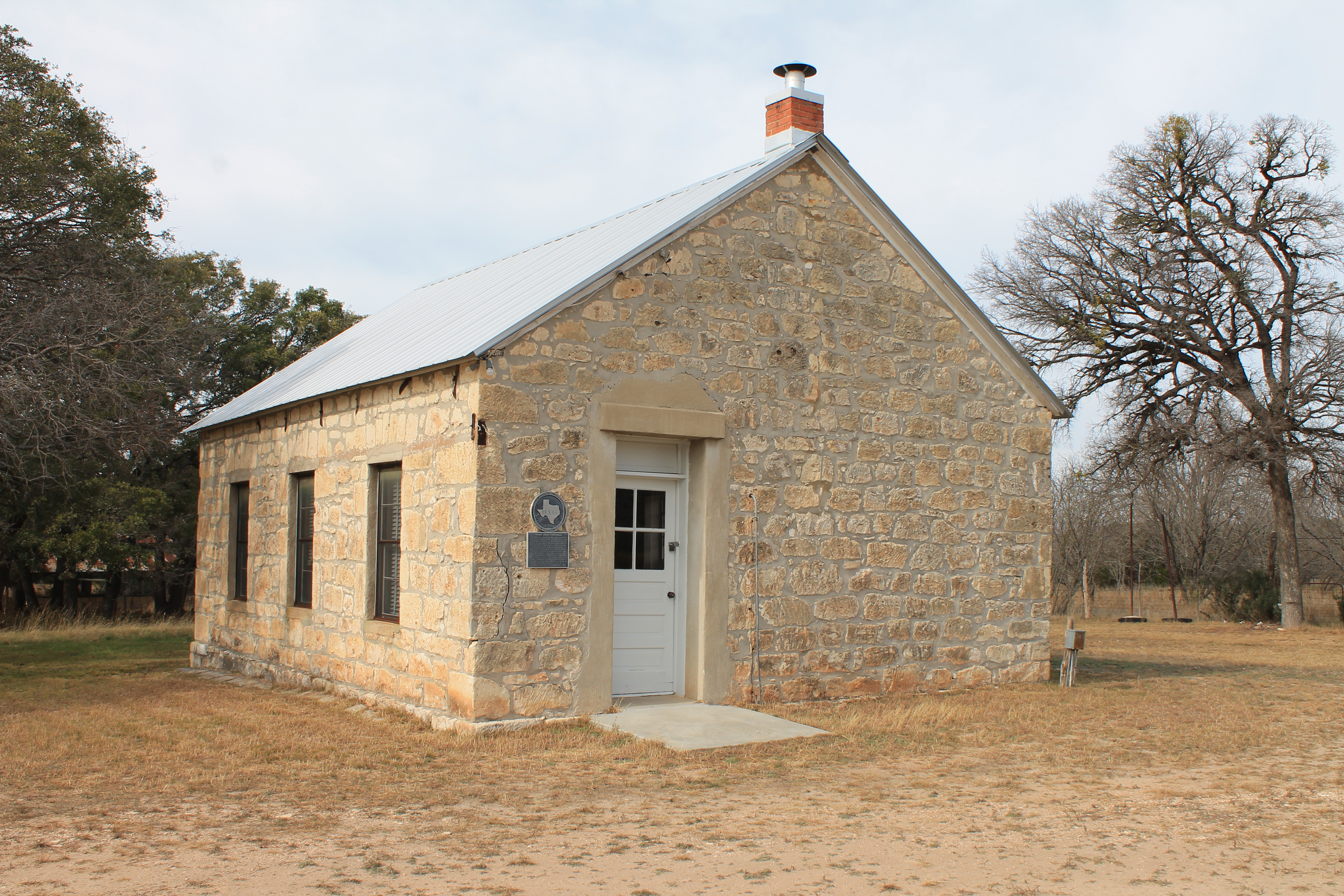
- Cherry Spring School

- Location within Texas Location within the United States
- Location: 5973 RM 2323, Cherry Spring, Texas
- Coordinates: 30°27′50″N 98°56′54″W
- Area: 2 acres (0.81 ha)
- Built: 1885
- NRHP reference No.: 05000389
- RTHL No.: 10017

Significant dates
- Added to NRHP: May 6, 2005
- Designated RTHL: 1988

Cherry Spring School is at 5973 Ranch to Market Road 2323 in Gillespie County, in the U.S. state of Texas. It was consolidated with Fredericksburg Independent School District in 1962. The building is now used as a community center. The school was designated a Recorded Texas Historic Landmark in 1988. It was added to the National Register of Historic Places listings in Gillespie County, Texas on May 6, 2005.

The Cherry Spring School is part of the larger Cherry Mountain School Complex, which also includes Das Alte Schulhaus. The complex was designated a Recorded Texas Historic Landmark in 1992. Das Alte Schulhaus, the Old Cherry Spring School, served the children of the community 1860–1878, before being converted for church services. The land had been donated by German nobleman Wilhelm Marschall von Bieberstein. Das Alte Schulhaus was designated a Recorded Texas Historic Landmark in 1985.

From 1878 to 1885, classes for children of German immigrants were held in private homes. The second Cherry Spring School was built in 1885 on land donated by H. Bratherich. Teachers would often board with area residents. The end of each school year in May was a community celebratory event with baseball, barbecue, a play, and an oompah band.

== See also ==
- National Register of Historic Places listings in Gillespie County, Texas
- Recorded Texas Historic Landmarks in Gillespie County
