= Willow City =

Willow City may refer to:

- Willow City, North Dakota
- Willow City, Texas
