= Willow City School (Gillespie County, Texas) =

- U.S. National Register of Historic Places
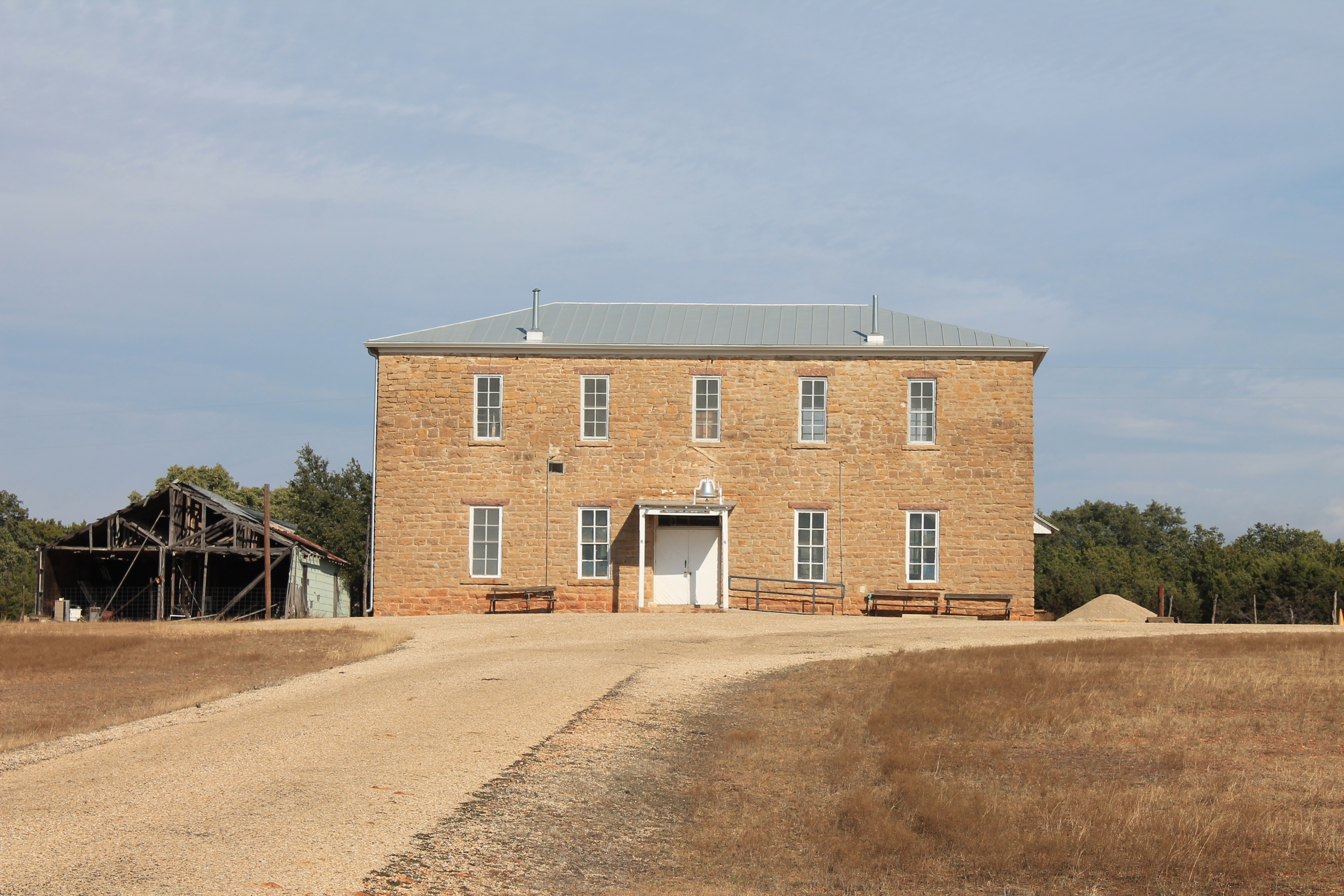
- Willow City School

- Location within Texas Location within the United States
- Location: 2501 RM 1323, Willow City, Texas
- Coordinates: 30°24′10″N 98°42′9″W
- Area: 5 acres (2.0 ha)
- Built: 1905
- Architectural style: Colonial Revival
- NRHP reference No.: 05000385
- Added to NRHP: May 6, 2005

Willow City School is at 2501 Ranch to Market Road 1323 in Gillespie County, in the U.S. state of Texas. It was consolidated with Fredericksburg Independent School District in 1961. The building is now used as a community center. It was added to the National Register of Historic Places listings in Gillespie County, Texas on May 6, 2005.

The first school was a one-room log cabin with no floor, which doubled as a church. After being destroyed by a flood in 1890, a two-story frame house was erected. The current Willow City school is a two-story granite building erected in 1905 on land donated by J.W. Lindeman and J. C. Hardin. There was no water supply until 1920. Classes were taught here until 1957.

== See also ==
- National Register of Historic Places listings in Gillespie County, Texas
