= Lower South Grape Creek School (Gillespie County, Texas) =

- U.S. National Register of Historic Places
- Recorded Texas Historic Landmark
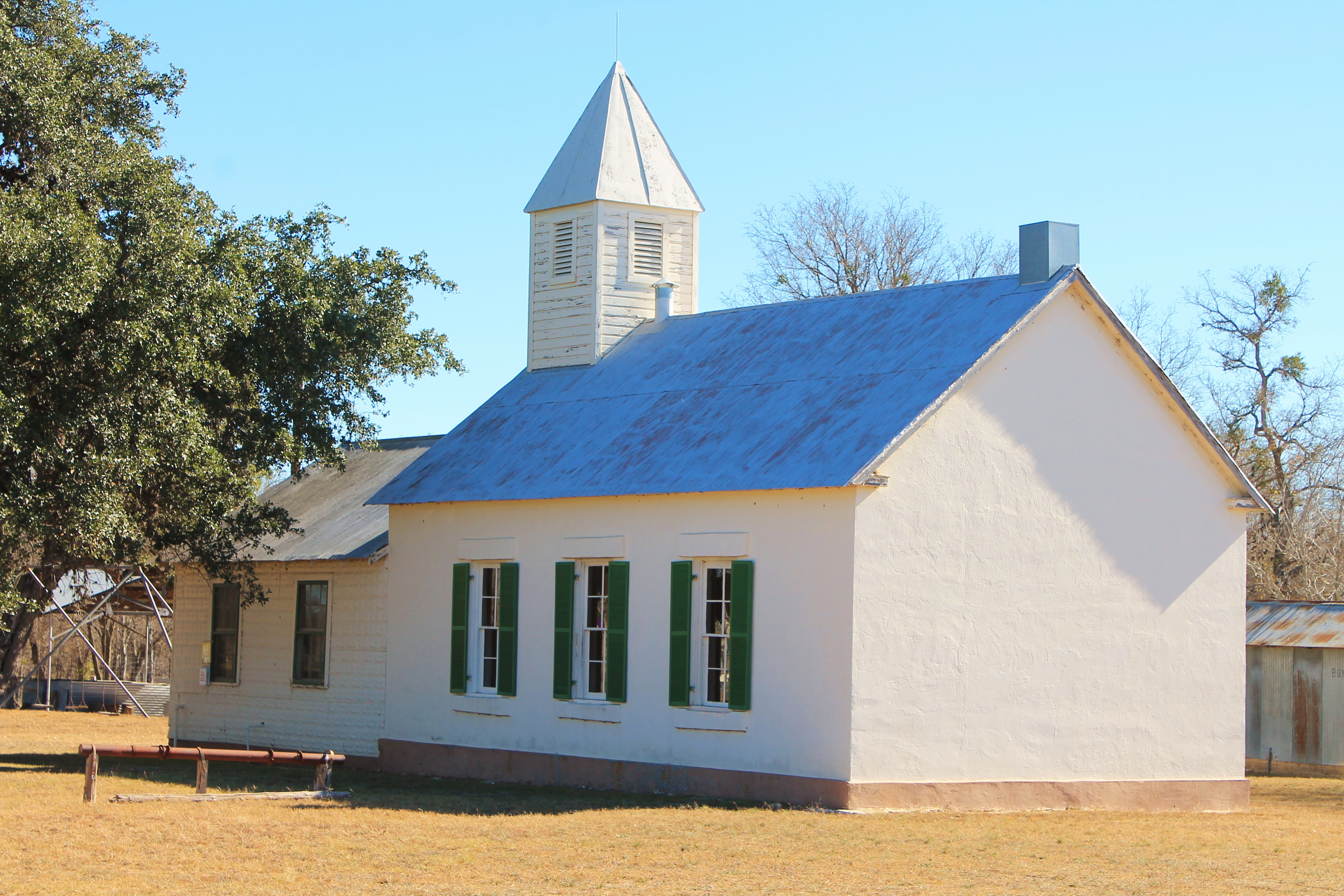
- Lower South Grape Creek School

- Location within Texas Location within the United States
- Nearest city: Fredericksburg, Texas
- Coordinates: 30°13′29″N 98°43′41″W
- Area: 1.1 acres (0.45 ha)
- Built: 1901
- NRHP reference No.: 05000391
- RTHL No.: 10073

Significant dates
- Added to NRHP: May 6, 2005
- Designated RTHL: 1994

Lower South Grape Creek School is located at 10273 E U.S. Highway 290 in Gillespie County, Texas. In 1960, the school was consolidated with Fredericksburg Independent School District. The building is now used as a community center. The school was designated a Recorded Texas Historic Landmark in 1994, Marker number 10073. It was added to the National Register of Historic Places in Texas on May 6, 2005.

== Community background ==
Luckenbach was settled on the Pedernales tributary of Grape Creek by German colonists such as the Luckenbach family, who arrived in Texas from Stein-Wingert, Germany, aboard the Brig Johann Dethardt January 12, 1846. They were among the first wave of colonists to Fredericksburg in 1846. In 1852, the Luckenbachs moved southeast to the area that came to bear the family name, and became naturalized citizens. William Luckenbach was the first postmaster of South Grape Creek, which was eventually discontinued in 1869. Other early colonists in the area along South Grape Creek were John M. Hunter, Wlihelm Feller and Peter Burg, who were among the petitioners to create Gillespie County, as well as Eramus Frantzen, L.F. Toepperwein, Friedrich Scharnhorst, John Blank, G.J. Weber, and Ferdinand Gellermann.

== School ==
The first school house at South Grape Creek was a log construction built on 1.33 acres (0.01 km^{2}; 0.00 sq mi) of land purchased by the Luckenbach trustees from widow Juliane Wehmeyer in 1871 for $50. The South Grape School District was part of the Luckenbach School Precinct No. 3, which covered Luckenbach, Grapetown, South Grape Creek, and Grape Hill. On May 12, 1889, the school on South Grape Creek was named Lower South Grape Creek School, District #21, because the Grapetown school was named Upper South Grape Creek School. Theodor Huelsemann was the first teacher and taught the Lower South Grape Creek school until 1880.

In 1901, a new one-room building was erected out of native limestone, on an acre of land bought for $5 from Charles and Martha Ahrens, 1.5 miles (2.4 km) north on U.S. Highway 290 (then known as the Austin Highway). The original structure had a pyramidal roof, with a chimney, tin roof and bell tower. Capital improvements in later years included a concrete slab porch large enough on which to perform school plays, electricity, and indoor plumbing.

Due to sagging enrollment, the school was consolidated with the Fredericksburg Independent School District in 1960. Designated a Recorded Texas Historic Landmark in 1994, Marker number 10073. Lower South Grape Creek School was added to the National Register of Historic Places in Texas on May 6, 2005.

== See also ==
- National Register of Historic Places listings in Gillespie County, Texas
- Recorded Texas Historic Landmarks in Gillespie County
