= Morris Ranch Schoolhouse =

- U.S. National Register of Historic Places
- Recorded Texas Historic Landmark
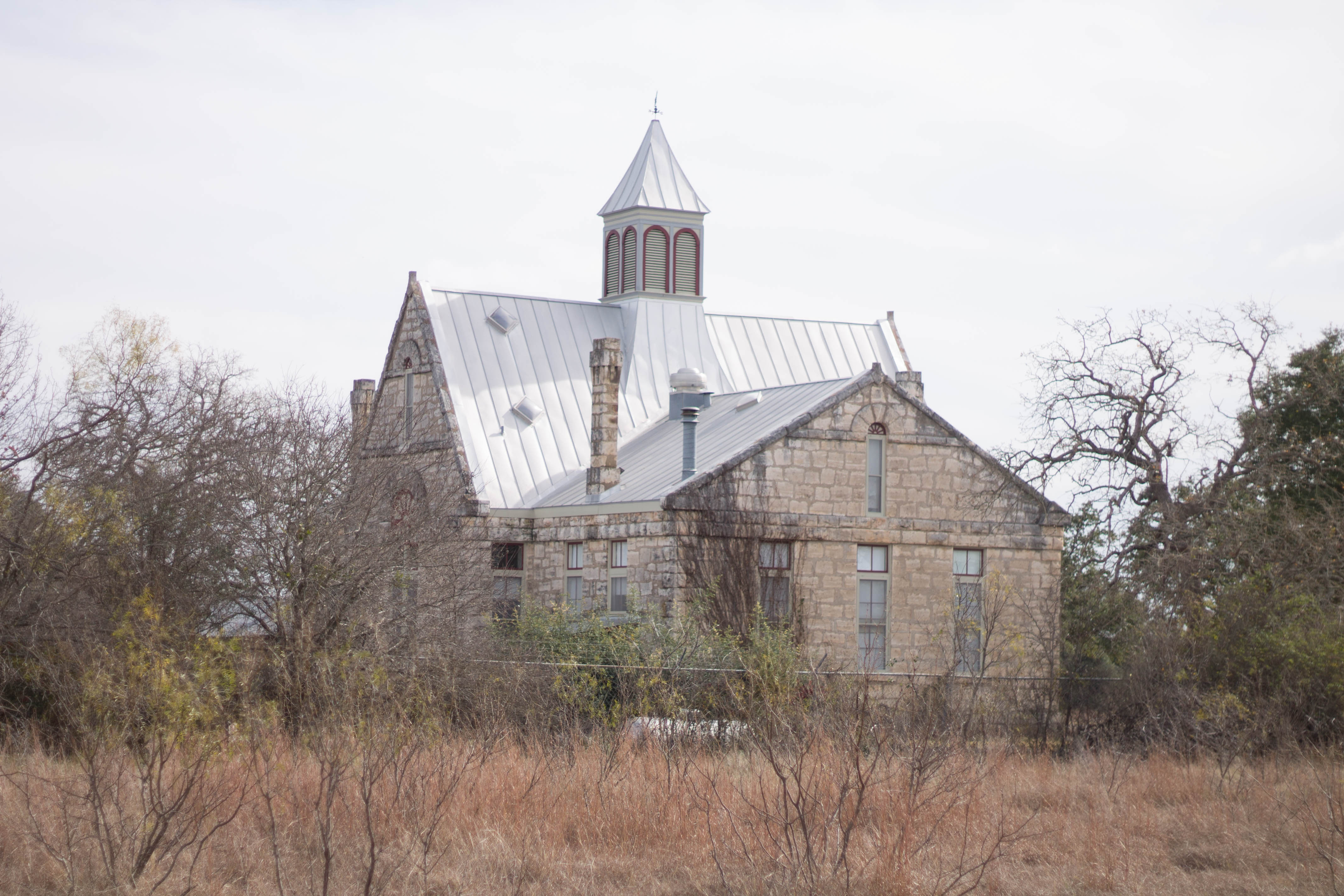
- Morris Ranch Schoolhouse

- Location within Texas Location within the United States
- Nearest city: Fredericksburg, Texas
- Coordinates: 30°13′7″N 99°0′56″W
- Area: 9 acres (3.6 ha)
- Built: 1893
- Architect: Alfred Giles
- Architectural style: Romanesque, Richardsonian Romanesque
- NRHP reference No.: 83003142
- RTHL No.: 10086

Significant dates
- Added to NRHP: March 29, 1983
- Designated RTHL: 1981

The Morris Ranch Schoolhouse is a ranch school located on Morris Ranch Road, 8.5 miles (13.7 km) southwest of Fredericksburg in Gillespie County, in the U.S. state of Texas. It was placed on the National Register of Historic Places in 1983, and was designated a Recorded Texas Historic Landmark in 1981. Designed by Alfred Giles, who also designed the 1882 Fredericksburg Memorial Library, the schoolhouse was built in 1893. Winning thoroughbred trainer Max Hirsch began his career on Morris Ranch and attended classes in the schoolhouse.

== Schoolhouse ==
The schoolhouse was originally part of the larger Morris Ranch, which was established in 1856 for horse breeding. After the ranch was converted into a thoroughbred horse breeding community, the schoolhouse was added to the property in 1893. The structure was built with a steeple and bell, doubling as a church. It was used by Episcopal, Baptist, Methodist and Presbyterian congregations. As a youth while a trainer at the ranch, Hall of Fame thoroughbred trainer Max Hirsch attended both school and church at the schoolhouse. In 1931, the school on its separate 9 acres (0.04 km^{2}; 0.01 sq mi) was deeded to Gillespie County. The school belonged to Morris Ranch Consolidated Common School District no. 40. In 1962, Fredericksburg Independent School District absorbed the Morris Ranch school district. The schoolhouse is currently under private ownership and not in use by the public.

== Design ==
The 1893 schoolhouse was designed by San Antonio architect Alfred Giles in the Richardsonian Romanesque style of native limestone. By the time of this project, Giles had already designed or remodeled San Antonio's old courthouse, the 1882 Gillespie County courthouse (now the Fredericksburg Memorial Library), the 1884 Wilson County Courthouse, the 1886 Presidio County Courthouse, and the 1886 Kerr County courthouse. He had also, by this point in his career, designed a number of historic homes in San Antonio.

The one-story schoolhouse was designed in a Cruciform shape, an architectural style named for its resemblance to a cross. It rests on a foundation of ashlar limestone blocks, with smooth limestone block walls. Cornerstones at each corner project outward. The center section, which divides two east-west facing sections, has an entrance facing southward, with sharply inclined gables higher than the other two wing sections of the house. The south section has a covered entrance way on its east side, and an identical covered entrance way on its west side. The middle center section is topped by a bell tower and served as a church and community gathering hall. The fronts of both the south and the west of the middle section each has two stone chimneys. The identical east and west gabled wings were reserved for the school classrooms. Window designs on the ends of all the gables were repeated triple windows topped by a singular rectangle opening. Indoor plumbing was installed in 1949.

== See also ==
- National Register of Historic Places listings in Gillespie County, Texas
- Recorded Texas Historic Landmarks in Gillespie County
