= Meusebach Creek School (Gillespie County, Texas) =

- U.S. National Register of Historic Places
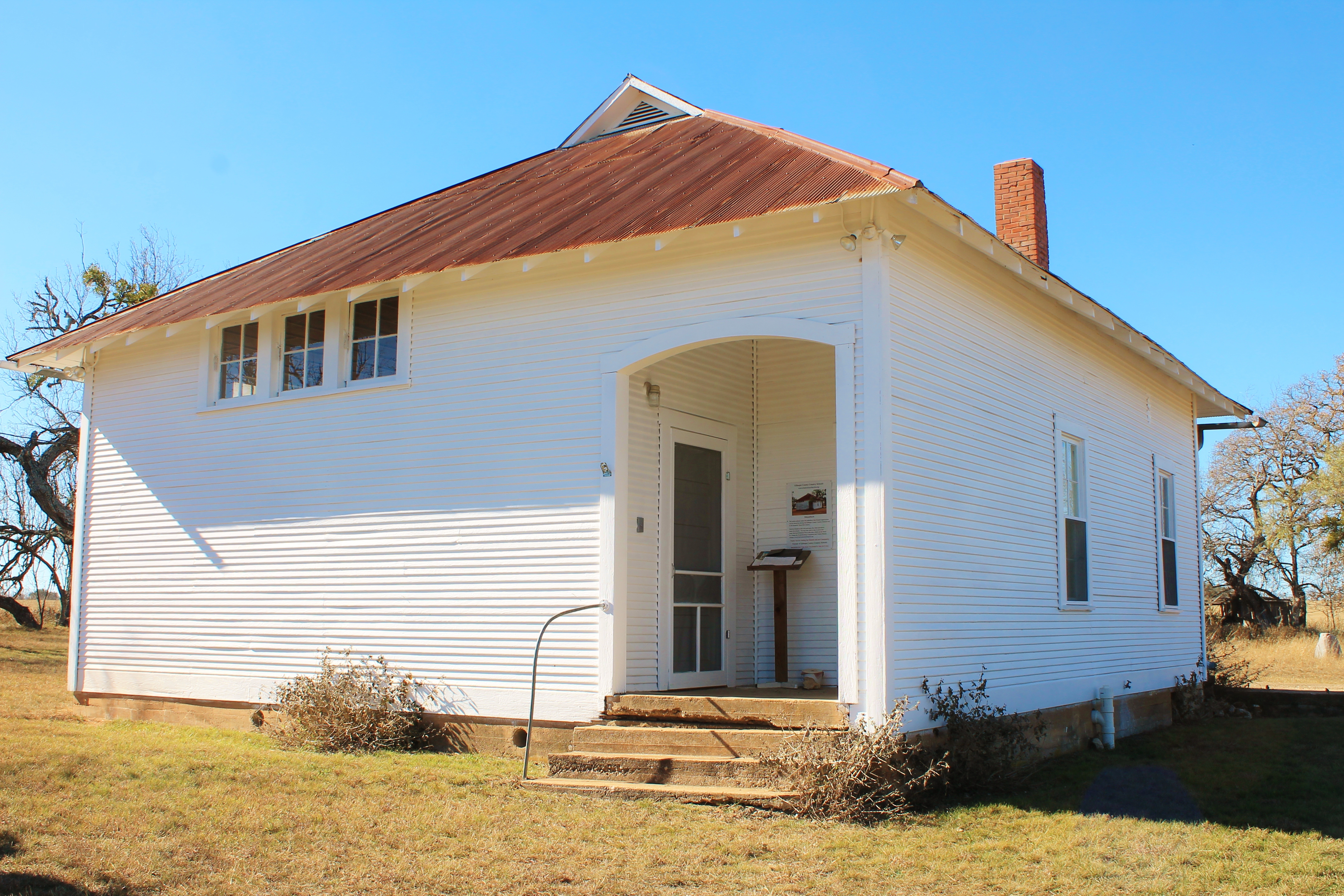
- Meusebach Creek School

- Location within Texas Location within the United States
- Location: 515 Kuhlmann Rd.
- Nearest city: Fredericksburg, Texas
- Coordinates: 30°12′22″N 98°51′23″W
- Area: 2 acres (0.81 ha)
- Built: 1931
- NRHP reference No.: 05000393
- Added to NRHP: May 6, 2005

Meusebach Creek School is located at 515 Kuhlmann Road in Gillespie County, in the U.S. state of Texas. It was consolidated with Fredericksburg Independent School District in 1954. The school is currently being used as a community center and was added to the National Register of Historic Places listings in Gillespie County, Texas on May 10, 2005.

Four buildings have served as the school. Erected on land owned by local resident Fritz Lochte, the original structure was a 96 square feet (8.9 m^{2}) shingle-roofed log cabin. In the post-Civil War years, enrollment included students whose parents had been slaves on an area cotton plantation. On the same property, the log cabin was replaced by a larger stone structure in the 1880s. In 1897, local resident Louis Bonn deeded an acre of his land over to the school. A new 1-1/2 story frame structure was erected to house the school. The current building was the fourth building to serve as the school. It was erected in 1931.

The school was originally bilingual with reading in both the German and English languages. The state of Texas eventually passed a law requiring all classes but language lessons to be solely in the English language. Tuition paid by the families supported the school and paid for the instructor. State financial education supplements allowed the district to offer free education for two months of the year, but charged tuition for the other months. The 1917 establishment of the local Social and Improvement Club helped provide improvements and furnishings for the school.

== See also ==
- National Register of Historic Places listings in Gillespie County, Texas
