= Wrede School (Gillespie County, Texas) =

- U.S. National Register of Historic Places
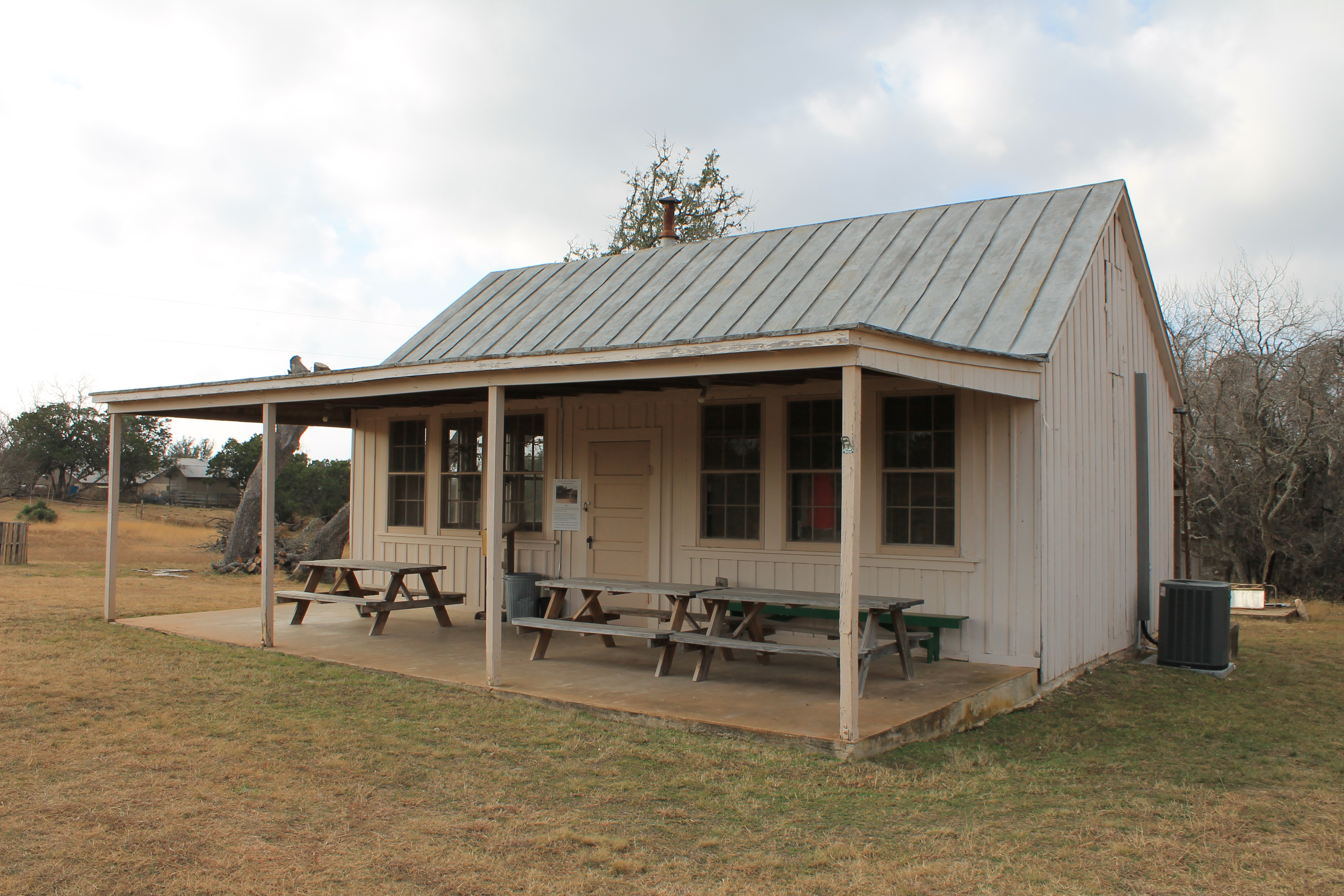
- Wrede School

- Location within Texas Location within the United States
- Nearest city: Fredericksburg, Texas
- Coordinates: 30°13′58″N 98°54′34″W
- Area: 3.4 acres (1.4 ha)
- Built: 1896
- NRHP reference No.: 05000519
- Added to NRHP: June 1, 2005

Wrede School is located at 3929 S. State Highway 16, Fredericksburg, Gillespie County, Texas. It was first built in 1896. The school district was consolidated with Fredericksburg Independent School District in 1960. The schoolhouse now serves as a community center. It was added to the National Register of Historic Places in Texas on June 1, 2005.

== Community background ==
The land on which the schoolhouse sits was owned by Friedrich Wilhelm von Wrede Jr (1820–?) who was born in Germany. Friedrich Jr. first came to Texas as a teenager with his family in 1836. He returned alone to Germany in 1843, but came back to Texas in 1844 as Adelsverein secretary to Prince Carl of Solms-Braunfels. He helped settle New Braunfels, and was one of the group who accompanied John O. Meusebach on the trip to make the 1847 Meusebach–Comanche Treaty. Wrede remained in Fredericksburg to establish a business enterprise. From 1850–1851, he served as County Clerk of Gillespie County. He married Sophie Bonzano, and the first four of their children were born in Fredericksburg. During the Civil War, Wrede served in the Gillespie Rifles, Thirty-first Brigade, under Captain Charles H. Nimitz, grandfather of Fleet Admiral Chester Nimitz. In 1865, the Wrede family returned to Germany.

Friedrich Wilhelm von Wrede Sr. (1786–1845) was the author of Lebensbilder aus den vereinigten Staaten von Nordamerika und Texas (Sketches of life in the United States of North America and Texas) first published in 1844 and later reprinted in English in 1970. The book was influential in persuading prospective German colonists to emigrate to Texas. He was a manager of Nassau Plantation. He and New Braunfels botanist Oscar von Claren were scalped and killed by a tribe of Comanche Indians while camping about ten miles from Austin.

== School ==
The first schoolhouse was constructed in 1896, from lumber hauled in from Comfort. The water supply was a hand dug well. The first school session opened with forty-six students on October 15, 1896. The Pedernales school and Bear Creek school were combined with Wrede in 1949. During its peak enrollment period in the 1950s, two teachers served fifty-three students. Teacher salary spanned the $28 a month paid in 1896 to upwards of $288 by 1959. Over its sixty-four year history, twenty-four teachers served the student body. Unusual for a community where only German was spoken in homes, speaking the German language on the school grounds was not allowed.

The school was consolidated with Fredericksburg Independent School District in 1960. Currently, the school is used as a community center and serves as a polling place during elections. The Friends of Gillespie County Country Schools has included Wrede in their preservation efforts.

Wrede school was added to the National Register of Historic Places in Texas on June 1, 2005.

== See also ==
- National Register of Historic Places listings in Gillespie County, Texas
