= Cave Creek School (Gillespie County, Texas) =

- U.S. National Register of Historic Places
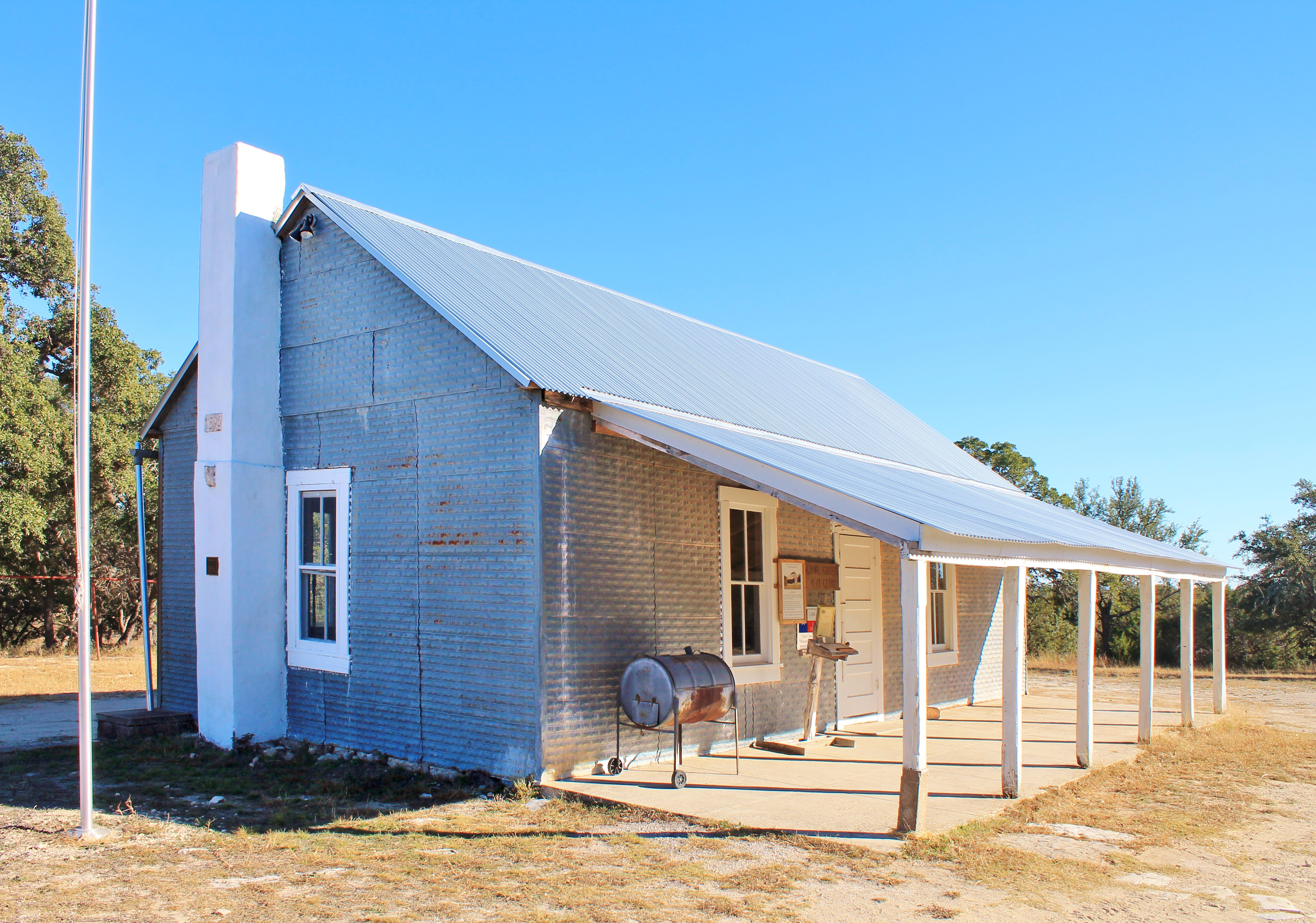
- Cave Creek School

- Location within Texas Location within the United States
- Nearest city: Fredericksburg, Texas
- Coordinates: 30°18′30″N 98°43′37″W
- Area: 12.1 acres (4.9 ha)
- Built: 1881
- NRHP reference No.: 04001415
- Added to NRHP: December 29, 2004

Cave Creek School is located at 470 Cave Creek Road, in Gillespie County, in the U.S. state of Texas. Built in 1881, it was consolidated with Fredericksburg Independent School District in 1950. The building is now used as a community center. It was added to the National Register of Historic Places in Texas on December 29, 2004.

== Community background ==
Cave Creek, Texas is an unincorporated farming and ranching community on FM 1631, approximately 10 miles (16 km) north of Fredericksburg. Tombstones in the Cave Creek Cemetery indicate a population primarily of German ancestry, settling into the area in the late 19th century. The area was named after the Pedernales River tributary of Cave Creek, on which it is located. The creek was so named because of natural caves along its course.

== School ==
In 1865, John Ebert donated 8 acres (0.03 km^{2}; 0.01 sq mi) of land to accommodate the need for a school for the community's children. James A. Larson was the first teacher in 1891 when the one-room schoolhouse opened for classes. A total of twenty teachers served students for sixty-eight years in the structure. Attendance peaked when Cora Hahn taught eighty-two students in 1917. A wood stove in the middle of the room heated the school in the winter, when the students brought in the wood to fuel it. The students were also responsible for cleaning the school. The end of school graduation ceremonies were an all-day community event that centered on a barbecue picnic and entertainment, with an afternoon graduation ceremony, culminating in an evening play presented by Cave Creek School alumni.

Local legend has it that one of the caves in the area was man-made by a recluse named Berg who brewed and sold moonshine, creating a cave to hide his activities and from the law enforcement. Known as Berg's Cave, the students often explored the site of the alleged moonshine business.

The school was consolidated with the Fredericksburg Independent School District in 1950. Cave Creek School was added to the National Register of Historic Places in Texas on December 29, 2004. The building is now used as a community center.

== See also ==
- National Register of Historic Places listings in Gillespie County, Texas
