= National Register of Historic Places listings in Gillespie County, Texas =

Location of Gillespie County in Texas

This is a list of the National Register of Historic Places listings in Gillespie County, Texas.

This is intended to be a complete list of properties and districts listed on the National Register of Historic Places in Gillespie County, Texas. There are five districts and 17 individually listed properties within the county. One district is a National Natural Landmark while another contains a National Historic Landmark that is also a State Antiquities Landmark, while the third holds a State Antiquities Landmark and multiple Recorded Texas Historic Landmarks some of which are individually listed properties. The individual properties include a National Historic Landmark that is also a State Antiquities Landmark, two additional State Antiquities Landmarks, and six Recorded Texas Historic Landmarks.

This National Park Service list is complete through NPS recent listings posted May 15, 2026.

== Current listings ==
The locations of National Register properties and districts may be seen in a mapping service provided.

	Name on the Register	Image	Date listed	Location	City or town	Description
1	Cave Creek School	Cave Creek School	December 29, 2004 (#04001415)	470 Cave Creek Rd. 30°18′30″N 98°43′37″W	Fredericksburg	
2	Cherry Spring School	Cherry Spring School	May 6, 2005 (#05000389)	5973 RM 2323; 30°27′50″N 98°56′54″W	Fredericksburg	Recorded Texas Historic Landmark
3	Crabapple School	Crabapple School	May 6, 2005 (#05000390)	14671 Lower Crabapple Rd. 30°26′30″N 98°49′54″W	Fredericksburg	
4	Enchanted Rock Archeological District	Enchanted Rock Archeological District	August 29, 1984 (#84001740)	Off Ranch Rd 965 at the Gillespie-Llano county line 30°30′20″N 98°49′05″W	Fredericksburg	National Natural Landmark; extends into Llano County
5	Feller-Barsch Homestead		September 12, 2019 (#100004372)	614 Ellen Lane; 30°12′34″N 98°43′14″W	Fredericksburg	
6	Fort Martin Scott	Fort Martin Scott	January 20, 1980 (#80004121)	The south side of Fredericksburg on US Hwy 290; 30°14′58″N 98°50′47″W	Fredericksburg	State Antiquities Landmark
7	Fredericksburg Historic District	Fredericksburg Historic District	October 14, 1970 (#70000749)	Roughly bounded by Elk, Schubert, Acorn, and Creek Sts; 30°16′33″N 98°52′25″W	Fredericksburg	Contains State Antiquities Landmark, multiple Recorded Texas Historic Landmarks
8	Fredericksburg Memorial Library	Fredericksburg Memorial Library	March 11, 1971 (#71000935)	Courthouse Sq. 30°16′31″N 98°52′24″W	Fredericksburg	State Antiquities Landmark, part of Fredericksburg Historic District
9	HA. 19 (Japanese Midget Submarine)	HA. 19 (Japanese Midget Submarine)	June 30, 1989 (#89001428)	National Museum of the Pacific War, 340 East Main St; 30°16′22″N 98°52′03″W	Fredericksburg	State Antiquities Landmark; part of the Japanese attack force Pearl Harbor that accidentally grounded and was captured. Its location was Monroe County, Florida but was moved to the National Museum of the Pacific War.
10	Klein Frankreich Rural Historic District		June 30, 2023 (#100009111)	3723 to 5083 North US 87, 103 to 206 Old Mason Rd. 30°18′24″N 98°54′23″W	Fredericksburg vicinity	
11	Lower South Grape Creek School	Lower South Grape Creek School	May 6, 2005 (#05000391)	10273 E US 290; 30°13′29″N 98°43′41″W	Luckenbach	Recorded Texas Historic Landmark
12	Luckenbach School	Luckenbach School	May 6, 2005 (#05000392)	3566 Luckenbach Rd. 30°11′12″N 98°45′16″W	Luckenbach	Recorded Texas Historic Landmark
13	Lyndon B. Johnson National Historical Park	Lyndon B. Johnson National Historical Park	December 2, 1969 (#69000202)	Lyndon B. Johnson National Historical Park; 30°16′17″N 98°24′53″W	Johnson City	Contains National Historic Landmark, Recorded Texas Historic Landmark; birthplace, home and ranch of President Lyndon B. Johnson.
14	Meusebach Creek School	Meusebach Creek School	May 6, 2005 (#05000393)	515 Kuhlmann Rd. 30°12′22″N 98°51′23″W	Fredericksburg	
15	Mittel-Kraus Rural Historic District		May 29, 2026 (#100013111)	554 and 1291 Shorty Crenwelge Dr. 30°17′51″N 98°54′16″W	Fredericksburg	
16	Morris Ranch Schoolhouse	Morris Ranch Schoolhouse	March 29, 1983 (#83003142)	Morris Ranch Rd. 30°13′07″N 99°00′56″W	Morris Ranch	Recorded Texas Historic Landmark
17	Nebgen School	Nebgen School	May 6, 2005 (#05000394)	1718 N. Grape Creek Rd. 30°19′01″N 98°37′18″W	Fredericksburg	
18	Pecan Creek School	Pecan Creek School	May 10, 2005 (#05000418)	3410 Pecan Creek Rd. 30°22′59″N 98°59′42″W	Fredericksburg	
19	Rheingold School	Rheingold School	May 6, 2005 (#05000388)	334 Rheingold School Rd. 30°20′42″N 98°41′13″W	Fredericksburg	
20	St. Mary's Catholic Church	St. Mary's Catholic Church	June 21, 1983 (#83003143)	306 W. San Antonio; 30°16′37″N 98°52′37″W	Fredericksburg	Recorded Texas Historic Landmark, part of Fredericksburg Historic District
21	Williams Creek School	Williams Creek School	May 6, 2005 (#05000384)	5501 South RM 1623; 30°11′45″N 98°36′01″W	Stonewall	Recorded Texas Historic Landmark
22	Willow City School	Willow City School	May 6, 2005 (#05000385)	2501 RM 1323; 30°24′06″N 98°42′17″W	Willow City	
23	Wrede School	Wrede School	June 1, 2005 (#05000519)	3929 S. TX 16; 30°13′58″N 98°54′34″W	Fredericksburg	

== See also ==
- National Register of Historic Places listings in Texas
- Recorded Texas Historic Landmarks in Gillespie County
