= Luckenbach School (Gillespie County, Texas) =

- U.S. National Register of Historic Places
- Recorded Texas Historic Landmark
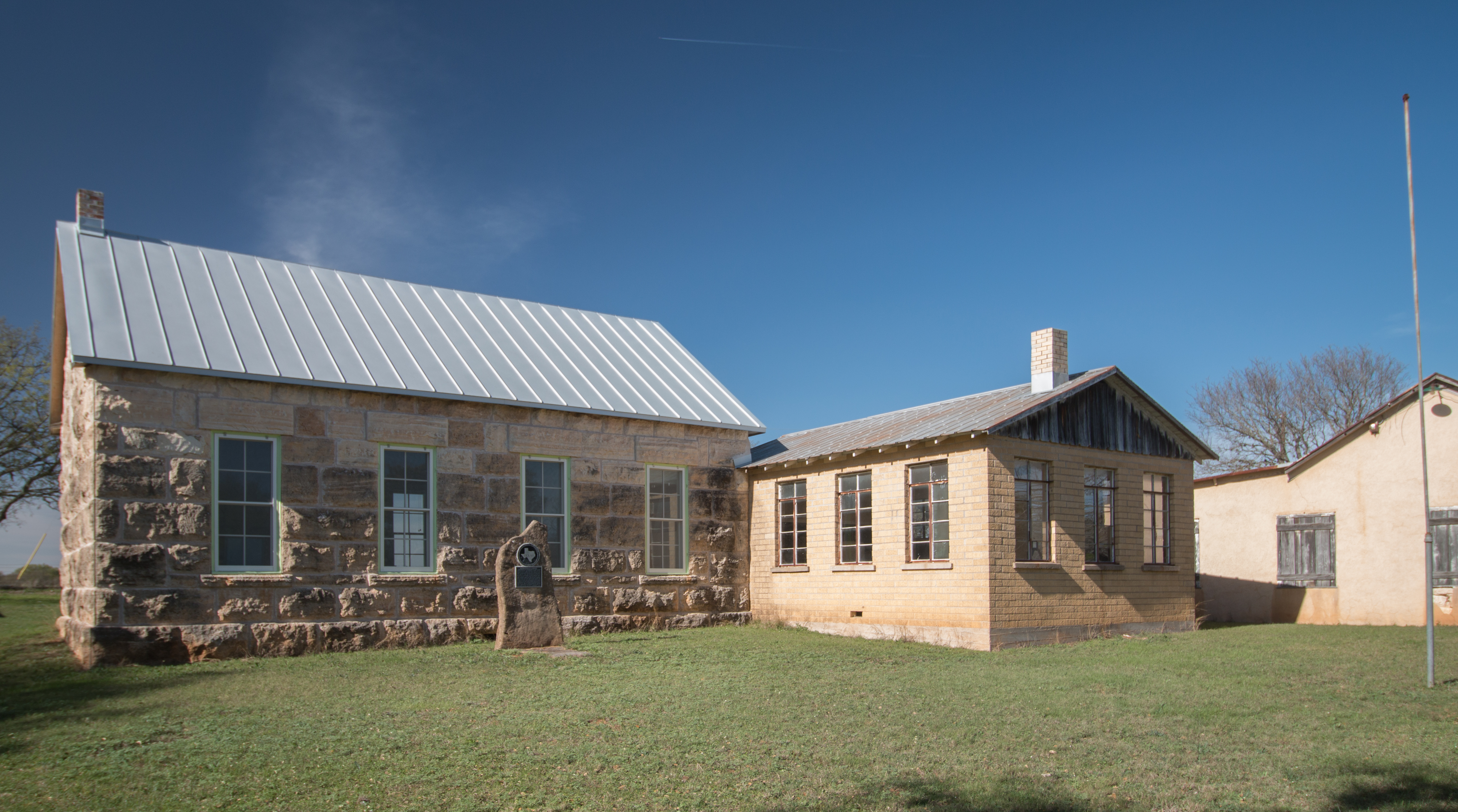
- Luckenbach School

- Location within Texas Location within the United States
- Nearest city: Fredericksburg, Texas
- Coordinates: 30°11′5″N 98°45′15″W
- Area: 2 acres (0.81 ha)
- Built: 1905
- NRHP reference No.: 05000392
- RTHL No.: 10075

Significant dates
- Added to NRHP: May 6, 2005
- Designated RTHL: 1982

Luckenbach School is a Recorded Texas Historic Landmark and on the National Register of Historic Places Listing. It is located at 3566 Luckenbach Rd. in Gillespie County, Texas. In 1964, the school was consolidated with Fredericksburg Independent School District. The building is now used as a community center.

== Community background ==
Luckenbach was settled by German colonists such as the Luckenbach family, who arrived in Texas from Stein-Wingert, Germany, aboard the Brig Johann Dethardt January 12, 1846. They were among the first wave of colonists to Fredericksburg in 1846. In 1852, the Luckenbachs moved southeast to the area that came to bear the family name, and became naturalized citizens. August W. Engel was the first postmaster of Luckenbach when the post office was established on August 30, 1886.

== School ==
The first school house at Luckenbach was a 16' x 15' log construction built on land purchased for $4 from Peter Pehl on July 22, 1855. It was constructed by the local men. When the need outgrew the building in 1881, a 10 feet (3.0 m) addition was built of native limestone. Luckenbach School was part of the Luckenbach School Precinct No. 3, which covered Luckenbach, Grapetown, South Grape Creek, and Grape Hill. Tuition was $1 per year per child. The school day began at 9 a.m., and the school week was Monday through Saturday. A one-room stone teacherage was built in the 1860s, with floors made of wooden planks salvaged from Indianola. The teacherage was later adjoined to the school house. A new schoolhouse of native limestone was built in 1905. In 1949, Luckenbach school became a two-teacher school in order to adhere to the state Gilmer-Aiken Act that limited the number of students per teacher. In 1964, the school was consolidated with the Fredericksburg Independent School District.

Designated a Recorded Texas Historic Landmark in 1982, Marker number 10075. Lower Luckenbach School was added to the National Register of Historic Places in Texas on May 6, 2005.

== See also ==
- National Register of Historic Places listings in Gillespie County, Texas
- Recorded Texas Historic Landmarks in Gillespie County
