= Enchanted Rock =

Rock formation and protected area in central Texas

Enchanted Rock District
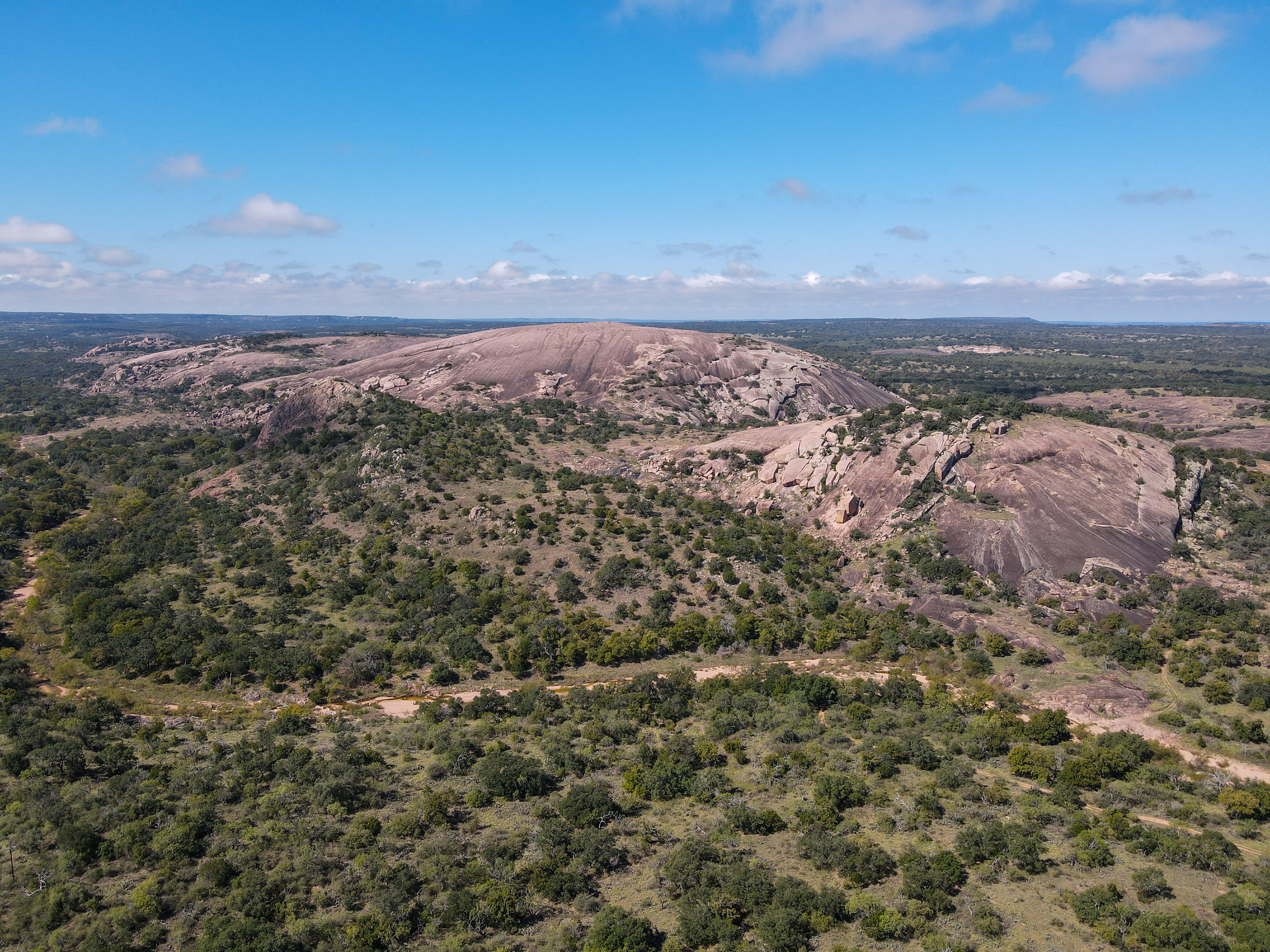
- Aerial view of Enchanted Rock

Highest point
- Elevation: 1,825 ft (556 m)
- Coordinates: 30°30′24″N 98°49′08″W

Geography
- Location: near Fredericksburg, Texas, US

Geology
- Mountain type: granite dome
- Enchanted Rock Archeological District
- U.S. National Register of Historic Places
- U.S. Historic district
- U.S. National Natural Landmark
- Area: 5,388 acres (2,180 ha)
- NRHP reference No.: 84001740

Significant dates
- Added to NRHP: August 29, 1984
- Designated NNL: 1971

Enchanted Rock is a pink granite mountain located in the Llano Uplift about 17 miles (27 km) north of Fredericksburg, Texas and 24 miles (39 km) south of Llano, Texas, United States. Enchanted Rock State Natural Area, which includes Enchanted Rock and surrounding land, spans the border between Gillespie and Llano counties. Enchanted Rock covers roughly 640 acres (260 ha) and rises around 425 feet (130 m) above the surrounding terrain to an elevation of 1,825 feet (556 m) above sea level. It is the largest pink granite monadnock in the United States. In 1971, Enchanted Rock was designated as a National Natural Landmark by the National Park Service. Enchanted Rock was rated in 2017 as the best campsite in Texas in a 50-state survey.

== Geology ==
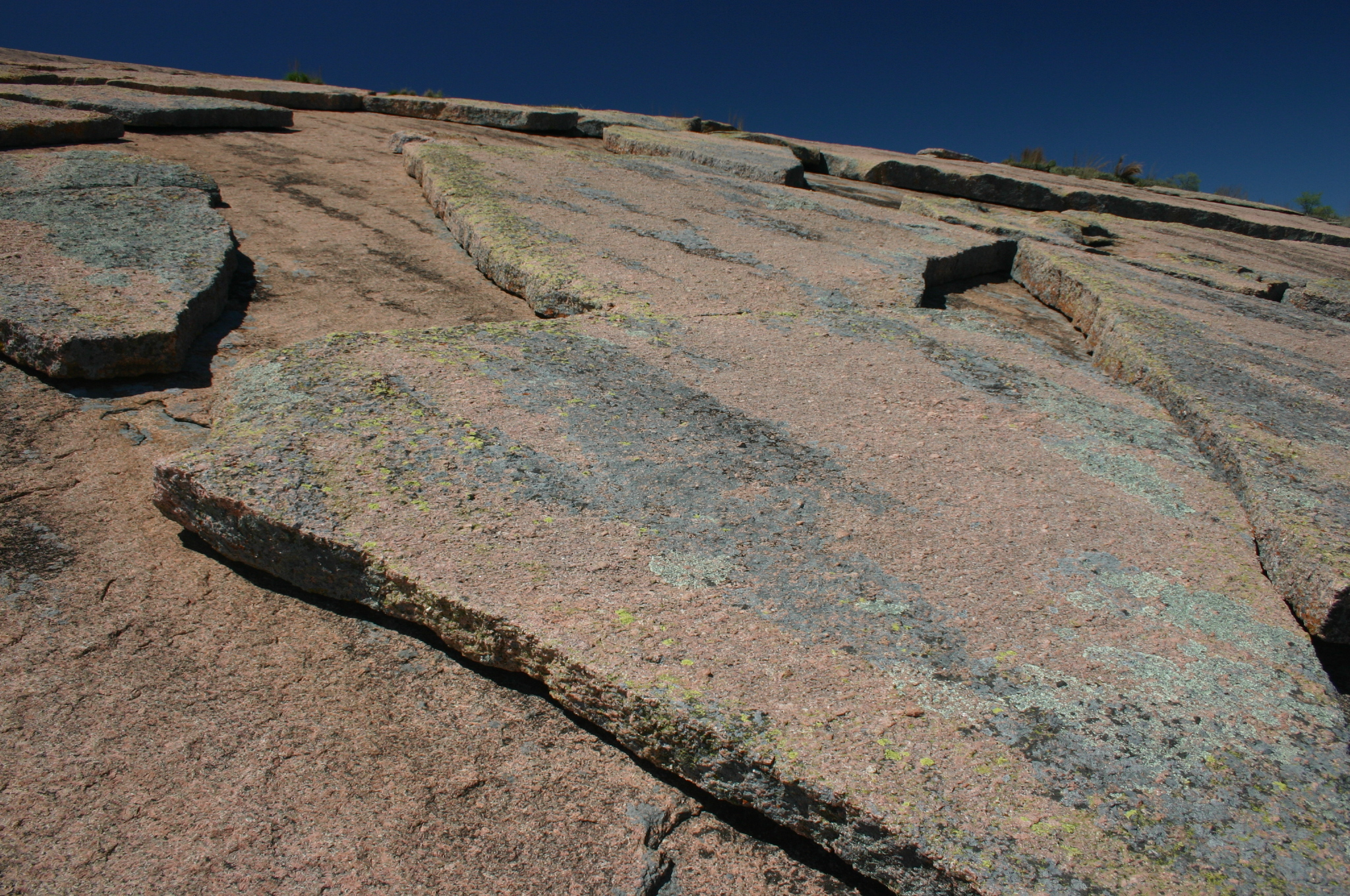
Geological exfoliation of granite at Enchanted Rock State Natural Area

The prominent granite dome is visible for many miles in the surrounding basin of the Llano Uplift. The weathered dome, standing above the surrounding plain, is known to geologists as a monadnock. The rock is actually only the visible above-ground portion of a segmented ridge, the surface expression of a large igneous batholith, called the Town Mountain Granite, of middle Precambrian (1,082 ± 6 million years ago) material that intruded into earlier metamorphic schist, called the Packsaddle Schist. The intrusive granite of the rock mass, or pluton, was exposed by extensive erosion of the surrounding sedimentary rock, primarily the Cretaceous Edwards limestone that is exposed a few miles to the south.

== Conservation ==
Texas Parks and Wildlife Department (TPWD) partners with Friends of Enchanted Rock, a volunteer-based nonprofit organization that works for the improvement and preservation of Enchanted Rock State Natural Area. Scheduled Summit Trail tours are on the third Saturday of the month starting April, May, September, October, November, and December. Private tours are available for groups at other times.

The Granite Gripper is an annual rock climbing competition that acts as a fundraiser for park conservation through the Friends of Enchanted Rock. Emphasis is placed on activity safety and ecological preservation.

Visitors are asked to keep human incursion at a minimum by not disturbing plants, animals, or artifacts. Pets are not allowed on the summit trail.

Federal and state statutes, regulations, and rules governing archeological and historic sites apply. The state Game Warden as a commissioned peace officer is authorized to inspect natural resources and take any necessary action for their preservation.

== Nature ==
=== Fauna ===
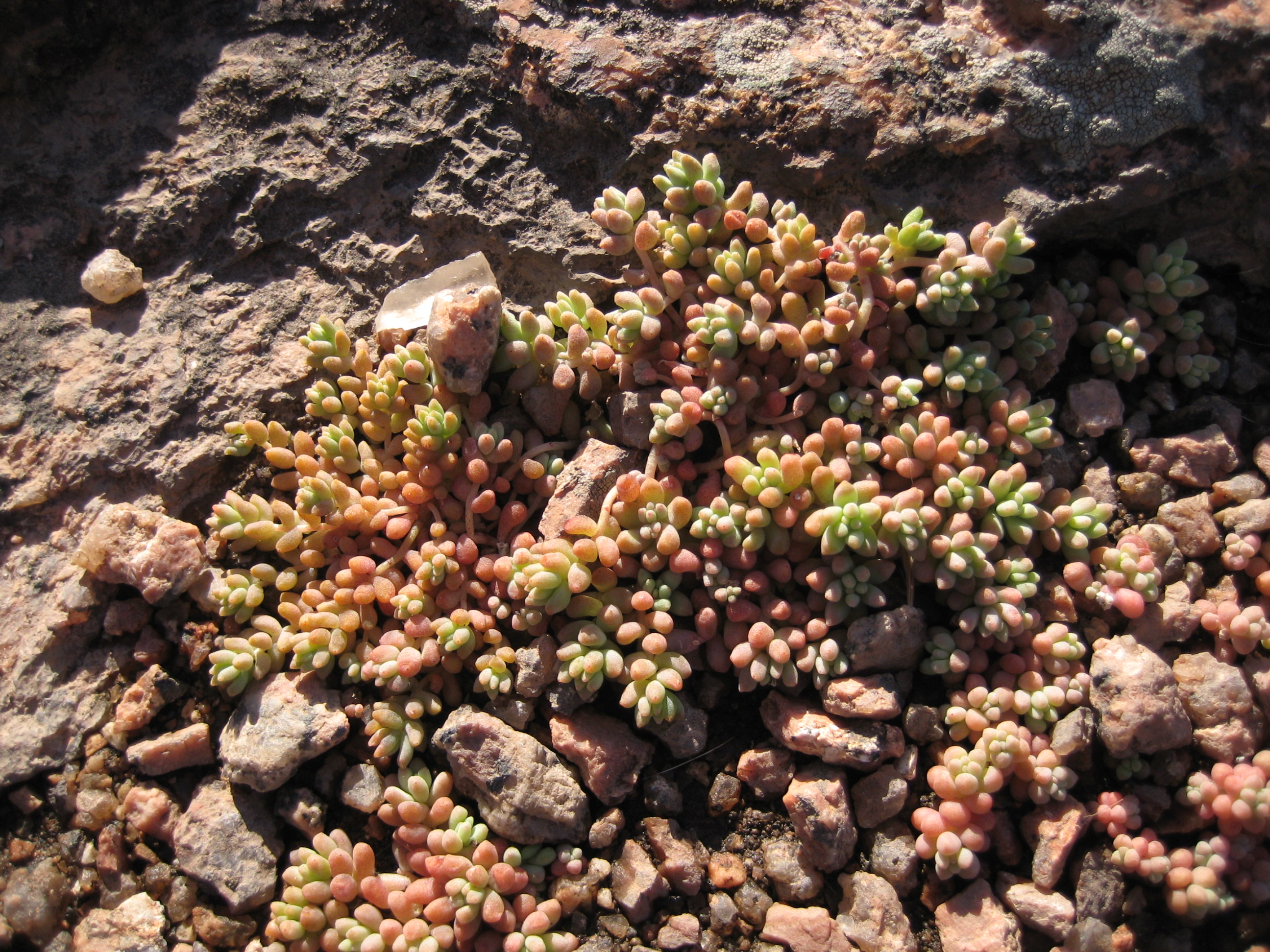
Sedum growing on top of Enchanted Rock near a vernal pool.

Wildlife at Enchanted Rock includes white-tailed deer, ringtail, Mexican long-nosed armadillo, rock and fox squirrel, rabbit, and red harvester ants. A wide variety of lizards, including the Texas horned lizard, also make the Enchanted Rock area their home. Vernal pools on the rock contain fragile invertebrate fairy shrimp.

Many bird species can be found here as well including wild turkey, greater roadrunner, golden-fronted woodpecker, Woodhouse's scrub jay, canyon towhee, rufous-crowned sparrow, black-throated sparrow, lesser goldfinch, common poorwill, chuck-will's-widow, black-chinned hummingbird, vermilion flycatcher, scissor-tailed flycatcher, Bell's vireo, yellow-throated vireo, blue grosbeak, painted bunting, orchard oriole, vesper sparrow, fox sparrow, Harris's sparrow, northern cardinal, canyon wren, and lark sparrow.

=== Flora ===
More than 500 species of plants, from four chief plant communities — open oak woodland, mesquite grassland, floodplain, and granite rock community — inhabit the rock. Specific species include plateau live oak, Texas beargrass, prickly pear cactus, and sideoats grama.

== History ==
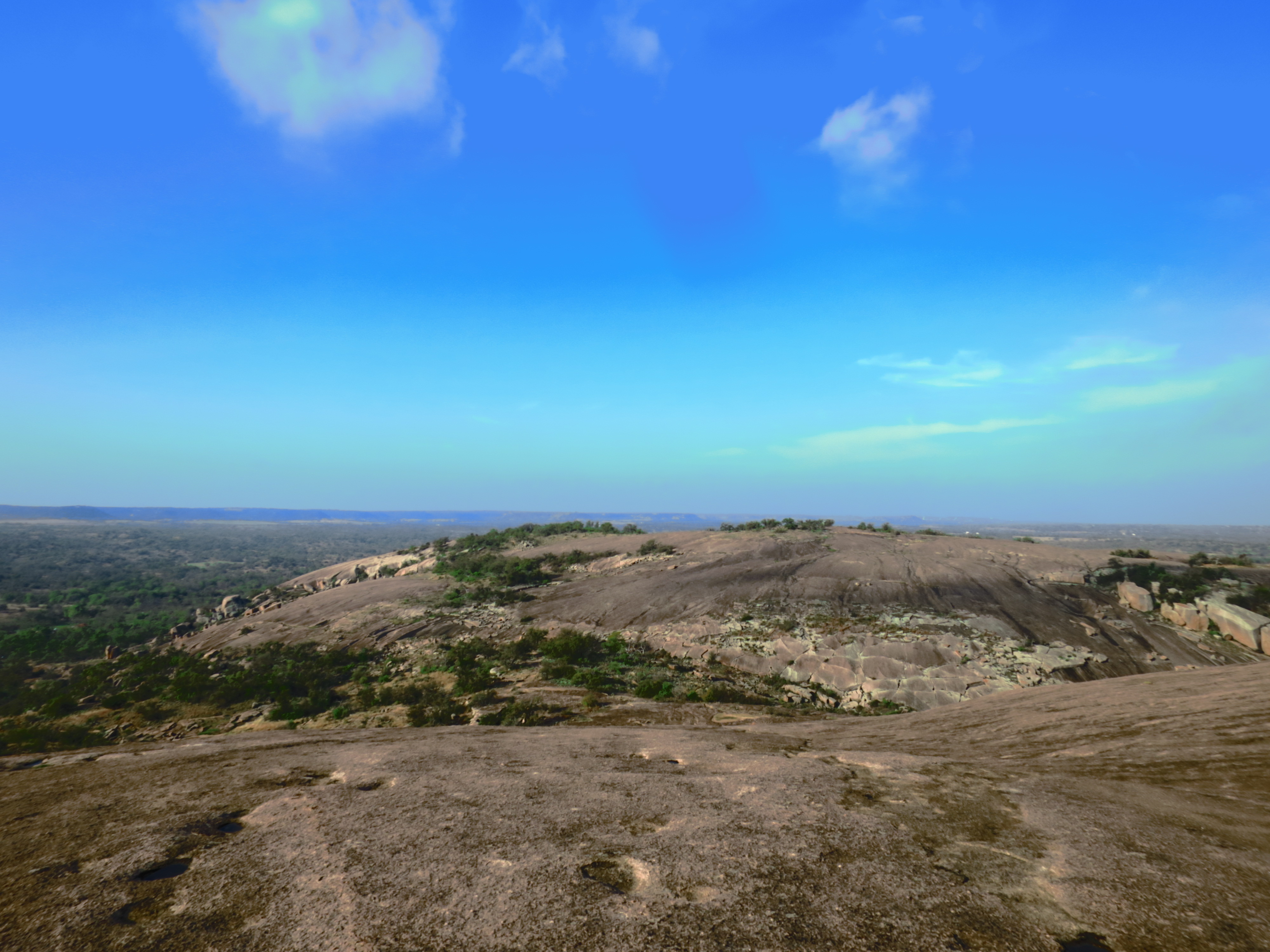
View from the summit of Enchanted Rock

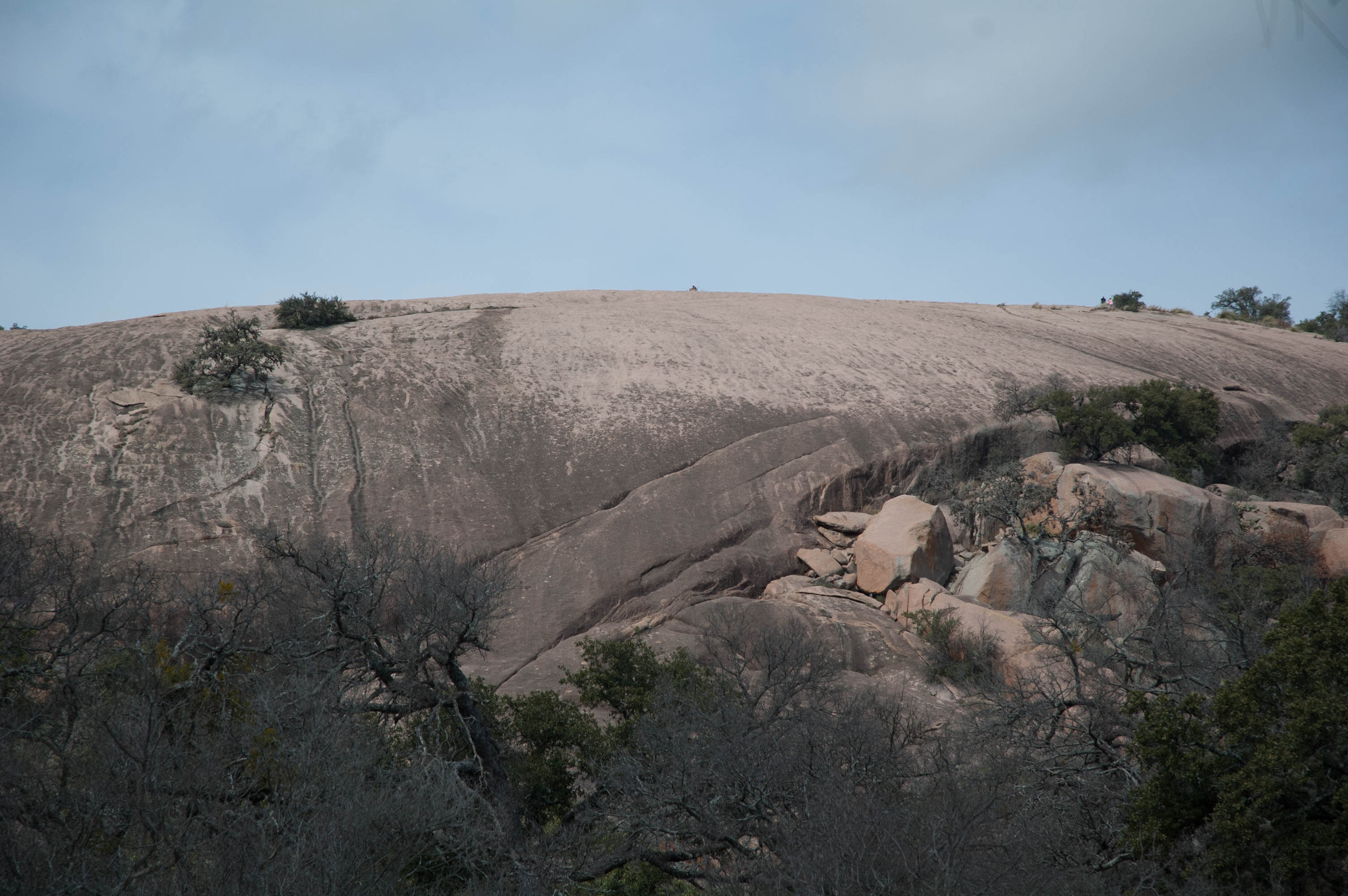
View of Little Rock

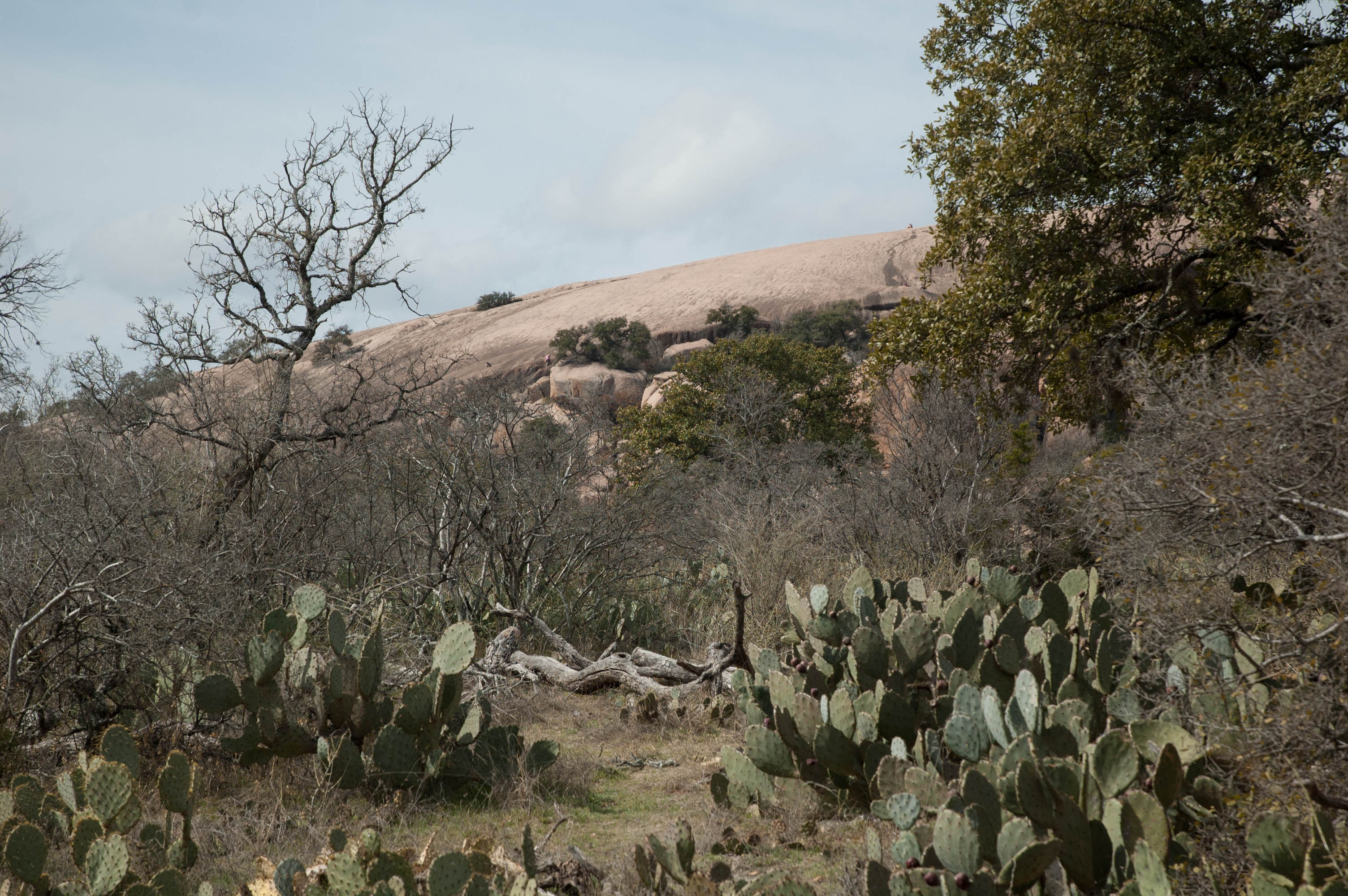
View of Enchanted Rock from base camp

Timeline of Enchanted Rock History
Date	Event
1838	March 16, Anavato and Maria Martinez issued headright grant ownership
1841	James Robinson, Texas politician, acquires property
1844	James W. Robinson sells to Samuel Maverick, lawyer, politician and a signer of the Texas Declaration of Independence.; Samuel Maverick has the land surveyed for minerals.
1880–1881	Samuel Maverick's widow sells to N. P. P. Browne
1886	N. P. P. Browne sells to John R. Moss; John R. Moss sells to his sister, Julia Moss Slator
1895	Julia Moss Slator sells to her brothers, Charles T. and Aaron F. Moss
1927	Charles T. Moss's son Tate Moss inherits and opens to tourism
1946	Tate Moss sells to Albert Faltin, who later sells a half interest to Llano rancher Charles H. Moss, C. T.'s grandson
1970	Declared a National Natural Landmark.
1978	Charles H. and Ruth Moss, by then having full rights, decide to sell the rock. First offer goes to Texas Parks and Wildlife but they cannot afford the asking price.; March 1, The Nature Conservancy, at the behest of Lady Bird Johnson, acquires the property for $1.3 million and agrees to act as interim owner until the State of Texas can take over, thus guaranteeing that the area will not be open to private development.; March 7, The Nature Conservancy, deeds the land to the State of Texas with the agreement that Moss will continue to operate it until June 1 of that year. United States Secretary of the Interior Cecil D. Andrus informs Governor Dolph Briscoe that a Federal land and water conservation grant will be made available for the purchase of the area when matched by state funds.
1984	The State of Texas opens it as Enchanted Rock State Natural Area after adding visitor facilities.; Enchanted Rock is added to the National Register of Historic Places

Archaeological evidence indicates human visitation at the rock going back at least 11,000 years, per the book The Enchanted Rock published in 1999 by Ira Kennedy:

These hunter-gatherers had flint-tipped spears, fire, and stories. With these resources, some 12,000 years ago, the first Texans became the wellspring of Plains Indian culture. Based on archaeological evidence, human habitation at Enchanted Rock can be traced back at least 10,000 years. Paleo-Indian projectile points or arrowheads, 11–12,000 years old, have been found in the area upstream and downstream from the rock. The oldest authenticated projectile point found within the present-day park is a Plainview point, dating back 10,000 years.

The rock has been the subject of numerous geological surveys and paintings.

=== Vandalism ===
In 2016, two citizens of San Marcos, Texas were arrested for vandalizing the "... south face of the summit at Enchanted Rock State Park". The summit was vandalized with graffiti again in 2018 but no arrests were made in that case. Such vandalism is a state felony in Texas, carrying "a penalty of up to two years in state jail and a $10,000 fine if convicted".

== In art ==
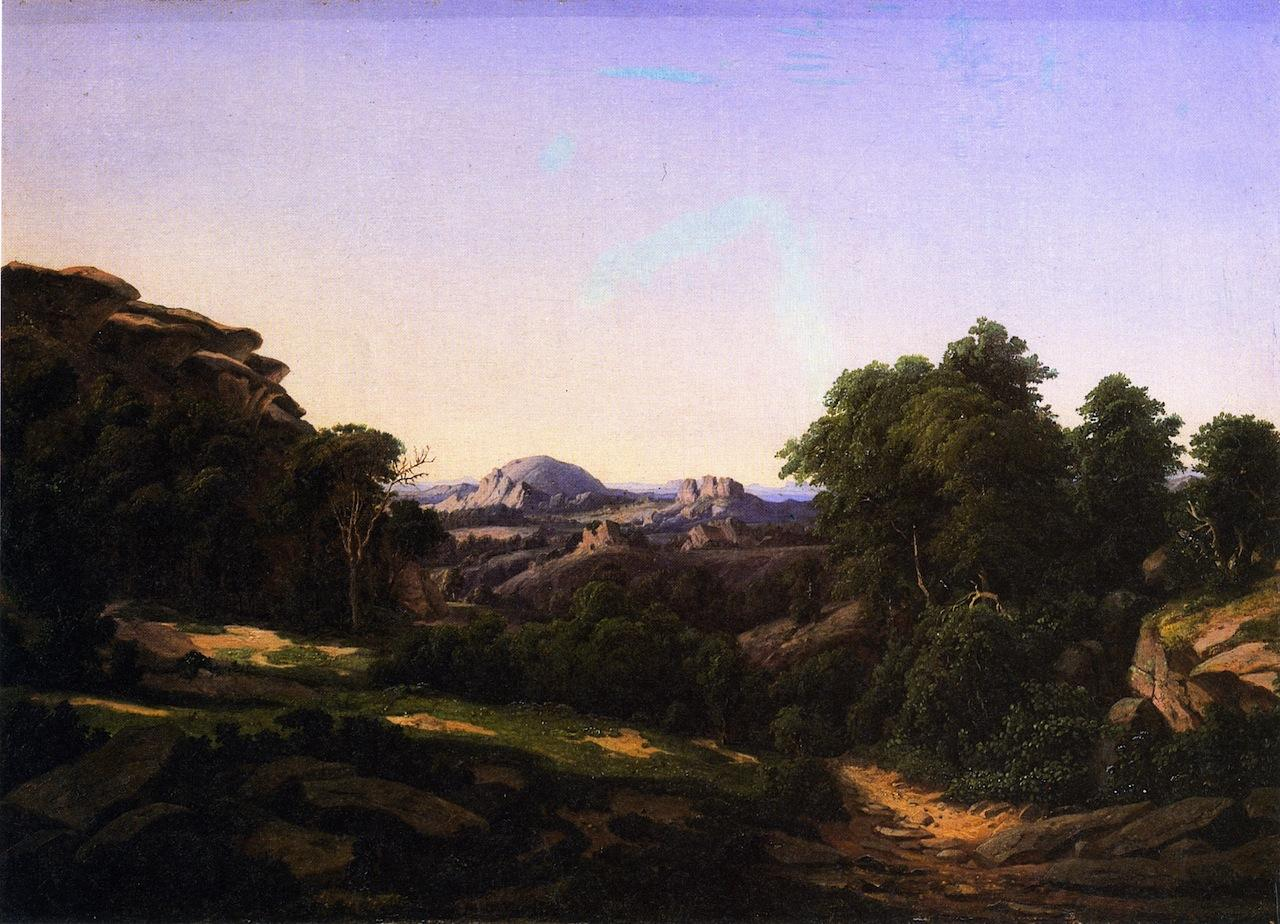
Enchanted Rock near Fredericksburg by Hermann Lungkwitz, 1864, oil on canvas

One of the earliest known depictions of Enchanted Rock is an 1864 painting by Hermann Lungkwitz, who made at least six paintings of the site. He wrote:

I wanted to penetrate more into the interior of the granite mountains. I found and painted a few charming views of the Enchanted Rock and the neighboring mountain ridges from my position on a very precipitous peak called Rauhenkopf. To reach my position of observation, I had to hike one and a half miles every day through mesquite brush and into rocky ground without any path ... Within a radius of six miles, one cannot find any human habitation—one can only camp out. The area at Crabapple near Grebe's and Max's farm is wildly romantic with many beautiful views.

Hill of the Medicine Man (1999) by artist Thomas Evans, a monumental (9' x 109') nine-panel mural depicting an aerial view of Enchanted Rock, is installed above the ticketing counters at the east end lobby level of Austin–Bergstrom International Airport.

== Legends ==
Folklore of local Tonkawa, Apache and Comanche tribes ascribe magical and spiritual powers to the rock (hence the name Enchanted Rock). The Tonkawa, who inhabited the area in the 16th century, believed that ghost fires flickered at the top of the dome. In particular, they heard unexplained creaking and groaning, which geologists attribute to night-time contraction of the rock after being heated by the sun during the day. The first European to visit the area was probably Álvar Núñez Cabeza de Vaca in 1536. To elude Anglo settlers in the area, the natives would hide on the top two tiers of the rock, where they could not be seen from the ground below. The name "Enchanted Rock" derives from Spanish and Anglo-Texan interpretations of such legends and related folklore; the name "Crying Rock" has also been given to the formation.

Fight at Enchanted Rock
- Part of Texas-Indian Wars
Date	Fall of 1841
Location	Enchanted Rock in Llano County, Texas
Result	Republic of Texas victory

Belligerents
Republic of Texas	Comanche

Commanders and leaders
John Coffee Hays	unknown

Strength
1	unknown

Casualties and losses
0	heavy

A plaque formerly embedded in Enchanted Rock near the top but now displayed in a kiosk below reads:

From its summit in the fall of 1841, Captain John C. Hays, while surrounded by Comanche Indians who cut him off from his ranging company, repulsed the whole band and inflicted upon them such heavy losses that they fled.

— Marked by the State of Texas 1936

Other legends associated with Enchanted Rock:

- Haunted by a Native American princess who threw herself off the rock after witnessing the slaughter of her people
- Alleged sacrifices at the rock by both Comanche and Tonkawa tribes
- Believed to be a lost silver, gold or iron mine
- Footprint indentations on the rock of a Native American chief who sacrificed his daughter, condemned to walk Enchanted Rock forever
- Woman's screams at night are of a white woman who took refuge on Enchanted Rock after escaping a kidnapping by Native Americans
- Spanish soldier Don Jesús Navarro's Enchanted Rock rescue of native maiden Rosa, daughter of Chief Tehuan, after her kidnap by Comanches intent on sacrificing her on the rock
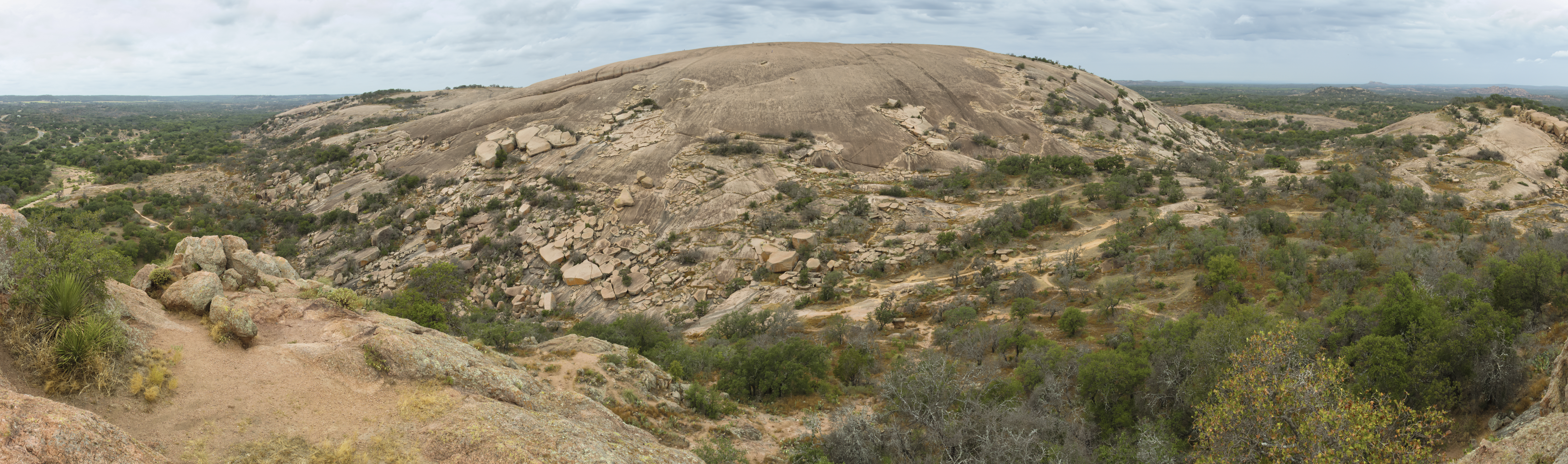
Enchanted Rock panorama
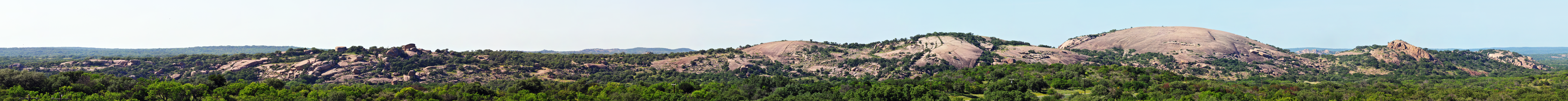
Full-width Enchanted Rock panorama

== See also ==
- Albert, Texas
- Cherry Springs Dance Hall
- Doss, Texas
- Easter Fire
- Harper, Texas
- List of National Natural Landmarks in Texas
- National Register of Historic Places listings in Gillespie County, Texas
- National Register of Historic Places listings in Llano County, Texas
- Spy Rock
- Stonewall, Texas
- Texas Hill Country
