= Luckenbach =

- Municipality
- Coat of arms

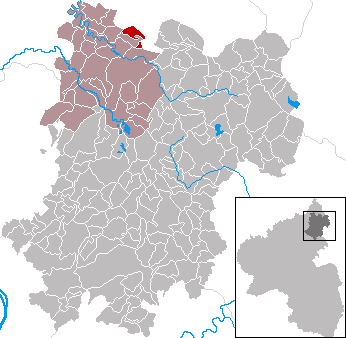
- Location of Luckenbach within Westerwaldkreis district
- Interactive map of Luckenbach
- Location within Germany Location within Rhineland-Palatinate
- Coordinates: 50°42′20″N 7°50′5″E
- Country: Germany
- State: Rhineland-Palatinate
- District: Westerwaldkreis
- Municipal assoc.: Hachenburg

Government
  - Mayor (2019–24): Dieter Bethke

Area
  - Total: 3.61 km^{2} (1.39 sq mi)
- Elevation: 290 m (950 ft)

Population (2025-12-31)
  - Total: 714
  - Density: 198/km^{2} (512/sq mi)
- Time zone: UTC+01:00 (CET)
  - Summer (DST): UTC+02:00 (CEST)
- Postal codes: 57629
- Dialling codes: 02662
- Vehicle registration: WW
- Website: www.luckenbach-ww.de

Luckenbach is an Ortsgemeinde – a community belonging to a Verbandsgemeinde – in the Westerwaldkreis in Rhineland-Palatinate, Germany.

== Geography ==
The village lies northeast of Koblenz in the valley of the Kleine Nister. Luckenbach belongs to the Verbandsgemeinde of Hachenburg, a kind of collective municipality.

== History ==
In 1366, Luckenbach had its first documentary mention.

== Politics ==
The municipal council is made up of 13 council members, including the extraofficial mayor (Bürgermeister), who were elected in a majority vote in a municipal election on 13 June 2004.

== Economy and infrastructure ==
South of the community runs Bundesstraße 414, leading from Hohenroth to Hachenburg. The nearest Autobahn interchanges are in Siegen, Wilnsdorf and Herborn on the A 45 (Dortmund–Gießen), some 25 km away. The nearest InterCityExpress stop is the railway station at Montabaur on the Cologne-Frankfurt high-speed rail line.
