= Cherry Springs Dance Hall =

Dance halls in Texas, United States

Coordinates: 30°29′00″N 99°00′33″W

Cherry Springs (Spring's) Dance Hall was one of the oldest and most historic dance halls in Texas. It was located at 17662 North U.S. Highway 87, Cherry Spring, TX 78624. The Texas farming community of Cherry Spring is 16 miles (26 km) NW of Fredericksburg, Texas, in Gillespie County's portion of the Texas Hill Country. The dance hall was established along the old Pinta Trail in 1889 as a stop for cattle drives. It was originally run by Herman Lehmann, son of German immigrants, Apache captive and adopted son of Comanche chief Quanah Parker.

Cited by the State of Texas Music Office as "one of the most historic dance halls in the world," the venue played host to some of the greatest legends of country music. Hank Williams once played here, as did Patsy Cline, Buck Owens, Webb Pierce, Ernest Tubb, George Jones, and many others. It was here on October 9, 1955, that the Louisiana Hayride Tour played, with Elvis Presley, Johnny Cash, Wanda Jackson and Porter Wagoner on the cusp of international fame for the performers. Author and musician Geronimo Trevino III likens the talent who have played there to "The history of country music."

== See also ==
- Enchanted Rock
- Loyal Valley, Texas
- Texas Hill Country

== Bibliography ==
- Logan, Horace (1999). The Louisiana Hayride Years: Making Musical History in Country's Golden Age. St. Martin's Press. ISBN 0-312-20661-5.
- Oberst, Stanley; Torrance, Lori (2001). Elvis In Texas: The Undiscovered King 1954–1958. Republic of Texas Press. ISBN 1-55622-887-2.
- Benson, Ray; Trevino, Geronimo (2002). Dance Halls and Last Calls: A History of Texas Country Music. Republic of Texas Press. ISBN 1-55622-927-5.
- Escott, Colin; Merritt, George; MacEwen, William (2004). Hank Williams: The Biography. Back Bay Books. ISBN 978-0-316-73497-4.
- Townsend, Charles (1986). San Antonio Rose: The Life and Music of Bob Wills. University of Illinois Press. ISBN 978-0-252-01362-1.
- Folkins, Gail; Wilkinson, Andy (2007). Texas Dance Halls: A Two-Step Circuit (Voice in the American West). Texas Tech University Press; 1st edition. ISBN 978-0-89672-603-1.
