= Stein-Wingert =

- Municipality
- Coat of arms

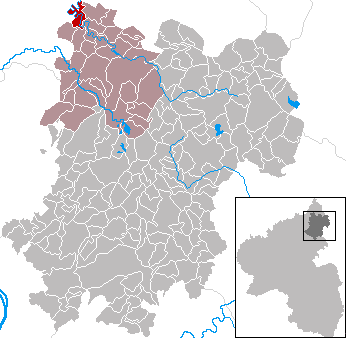
- Location of Stein-Wingert within Westerwaldkreis district
- Interactive map of Stein-Wingert
- Location within Germany Location within Rhineland-Palatinate
- Coordinates: 50°43′21″N 7°44′27″E
- Country: Germany
- State: Rhineland-Palatinate
- District: Westerwaldkreis
- Municipal assoc.: Hachenburg
- Subdivisions: 4

Government
  - Mayor (2019–24): Christian Funk

Area
  - Total: 3.50 km^{2} (1.35 sq mi)
- Elevation: 182 m (597 ft)

Population (2025-12-31)
  - Total: 215
  - Density: 61.4/km^{2} (159/sq mi)
- Time zone: UTC+01:00 (CET)
  - Summer (DST): UTC+02:00 (CEST)
- Postal codes: 57629
- Dialling codes: 02688
- Vehicle registration: WW
- Website: www.hachenburg-vg.de

Stein-Wingert is an Ortsgemeinde – a community belonging to a Verbandsgemeinde – in the Westerwaldkreis in Rhineland-Palatinate, Germany.

== Geography ==
=== Location ===
The community lies in the Westerwald between Limburg and Siegen, on the river Nister in the middle of the Kroppach Switzerland (Kroppacher Schweiz). The residential community of Stein-Wingert belongs to the Verbandsgemeinde of Hachenburg, a kind of collective municipality. Its seat is in the like-named town.

=== Constituent communities ===
Stein-Wingert's Ortsteile are Wingert, Stein, Alhausen and Altburg.

== History ==
Stein-Wingert belonged in the 12th century first to the landlords of Nister. Already by the early 13th century, the community passed to the Lords of Sayn, and in 1649/71 to Sayn-Hachenburg, with which it fell to Nassau-Weilburg in 1799. In 1806, Stein-Wingert passed to the Duchy of Nassau, and as of 1866 it was in Prussia’s province of Hesse-Nassau.

== Politics ==
The municipal council is made up of 7 council members, including the extraofficial mayor (Bürgermeister), who were elected in a majority vote in a municipal election on 13 June 2004.

== Regular events ==
Since 1984, every other year on the last weekend in June, the Backtrogrennen (“Dough Trough Race”) has been held. This custom imported from southern Germany consists of paddling down a stretch of the river Nister and back up again in wooden troughs. As of 2007, the festival is to be held in odd-numbered years, as it did not take place in 2006 owing to the Football World Cup.

== Economy and infrastructure ==
Stein-Wingert is served by the local bus line 410 (Hachenburg - Wissen) and located in the area of the transport association Verkehrsverbund Rhein-Mosel (VRM), zone number 452. South of the community runs Bundesstraße 414, leading from Altenkirchen to Hachenburg. The nearest Autobahn interchanges are in Siegen, Wilnsdorf and Herborn on the A 45 (Dortmund–Gießen). The nearest InterCityExpress stop is the railway station at Montabaur on the Cologne-Frankfurt high-speed rail line. Stein-Wingert is located at the Marienwanderweg, a walking path leading from Marienstatt Abbey in Streithausen to Marienthal Abbey (Westerwald).
