= Cherry Spring, Texas =

- Unincorporated community
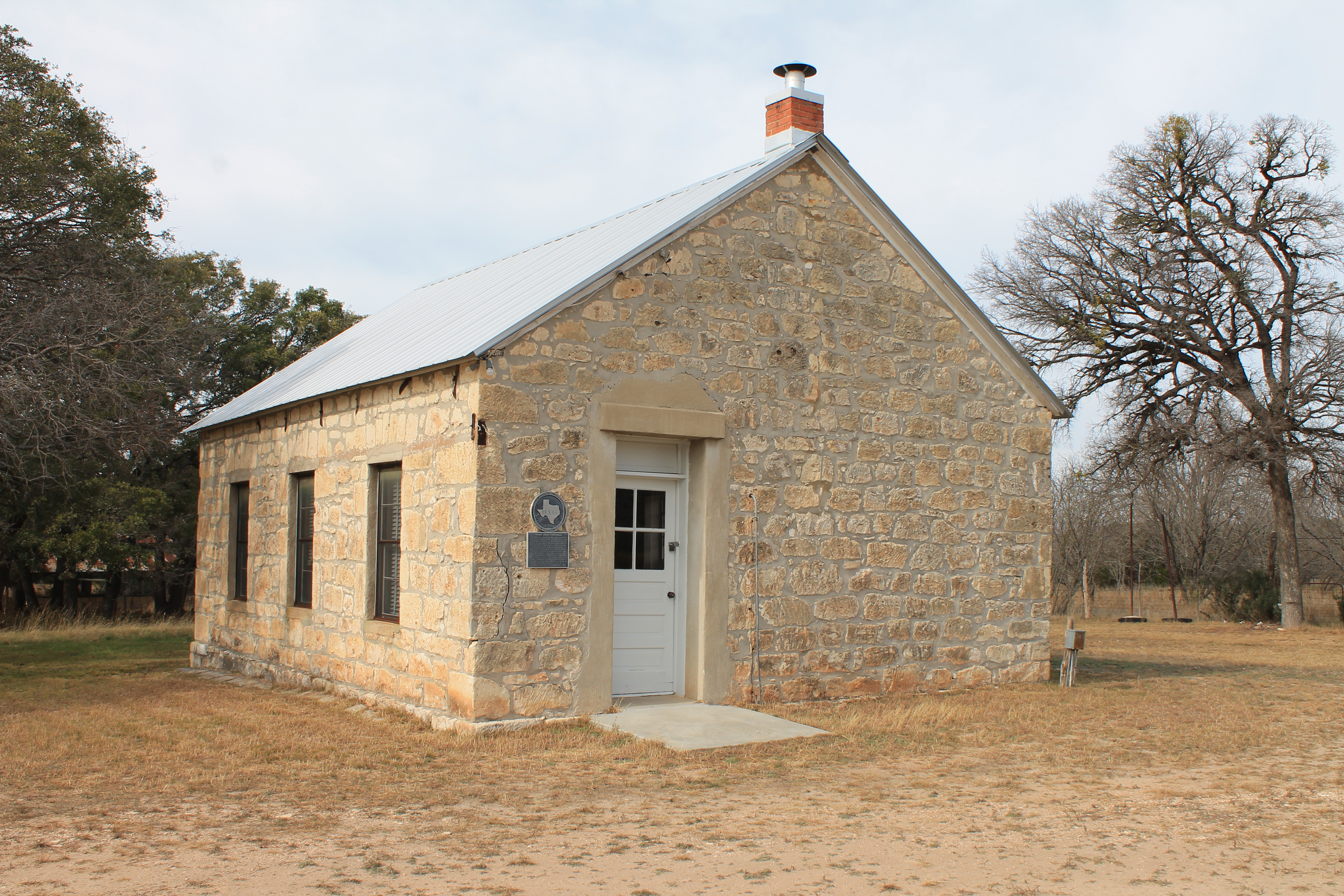
- Cherry Spring schoolhouse

- Location within the state of Texas Cherry Spring (the United States)
- Coordinates: 30°29′00″N 99°00′33″W
- Country: United States
- State: Texas
- County: Gillespie
- Elevation: 1,791 ft (546 m)

Population (2000)
  - Total: 25
- Time zone: UTC-6 (Central (CST))
  - Summer (DST): UTC-5 (CDT)
- Area code: 830
- FIPS code: 48-14572
- GNIS feature ID: 1379538

Cherry Spring is an unincorporated farming and ranching community established in 1852 in Gillespie County, in the U.S. state of Texas. It is located on Cherry Spring Creek, which runs from north of Fredericksburg to Llano. The creek was also sometimes known as Cherry Springs Creek by residents. The community is located on the old Pinta Trail. The Cherry Spring School was added to the National Register of Historic Places Listings in Gillespie County, Texas on May 6, 2005. The school was designated a Recorded Texas Historic Landmark in 1985.

Current population is 75. Elevation 1,791 feet.

== Settlers and Community ==
On December 15, 1847, a petition was submitted to create Gillespie County. In 1848, the legislature formed Gillespie County from Bexar and Travis counties. While the signers were overwhelmingly German immigrants, names also on the petition were Castillo, Pena, Munos, and a handful of non-German Anglo names.

The community was originally settled by German immigrants Dietrich Rode, a director of the original Zion Lutheran Church in Fredericksburg, and William Kothe in 1852. Rode also served as a Lutheran lay minister in his home at Cherry Springs, leading to the establishment of Christ Lutheran Church. The still active church has some 200 members. Mr. Rode's original home still stands near the church.

The 1860 Census of Gillespie County listed 117 people in Cherry Spring.

John O. Meusebach brokered the Meusebach-Comanche Treaty in 1847, making area settlers safe from Comanche raids. However, Kiowa, and Apache depredations were still committed against the settlers. The most famous white captive of the area was Herman Lehmann. Lehmann later ran the cattle drive stop that became the Cherry Springs Dance Hall.

== Cherry Spring School ==
The Cherry Mountain School Complex includes Das Alte Schulhaus (the original school) and the Cherry Spring School. The complex, the original school and Cherry Spring School were separately designated Recorded Texas Historic Landmarks. The Cherry Spring School is listed on the National Register of Historic Places listings in Gillespie County, Texas.

== See also ==
- Cherry Springs Dance Hall
- Enchanted Rock
- Texas Hill Country
