= Fredericksburg Independent School District =

School district in Texas

Address
- 234 Friendship Lane Fredericksburg, Texas, 78624; United States

District information
- Grades: PK–12
- Schools: 6
- NCES District ID: 4819840

Students and staff
- Students: 3,005 (2023–2024)
- Teachers: 214.26 (on an FTE basis)
- Student–teacher ratio: 14.03:1

Other information
- Website: www.fisd.org

Fredericksburg Independent School District is a public school district based in Fredericksburg, Texas, United States.

In addition to Fredericksburg, the district serves the unincorporated communities of Stonewall, Luckenbach, Willow City, and Albert. Located in Gillespie County, small portions of the district extend into Blanco and Kendall Counties.

In 2009, the school district was rated "academically acceptable" by the Texas Education Agency.

== Schools ==
- Fredericksburg High (grades 9-12)
  - 1999-2000 National Blue Ribbon School
- Fredericksburg Middle (grades 6-8)
- Fredericksburg Elementary (grades 1-5)
- Fredericksburg Primary (prekindergarten and kindergarten)
- Stonewall Elementary (kindergarten-grade 5)

== See also ==
- Cave Creek School
- Cherry Spring School
- Crabapple School
- Lower South Grape Creek School
- Luckenbach School
- Morris Ranch Schoolhouse
- Rheingold School
- Willow City School
- Wrede School
