= Willow City, Texas =

- Unincorporated community
- Location within the state of Texas Willow City (the United States)
- Coordinates: 30°24′03″N 98°42′05″W
- Country: United States
- State: Texas
- County: Gillespie
- Elevation: 1,713 ft (522 m)
- Time zone: UTC-6 (Central (CST))
  - Summer (DST): UTC-5 (CDT)
- ZIP code: 78675
- Area code: 830
- FIPS code: 48-79432
- GNIS feature ID: 1380785

Willow City is an unincorporated community in Gillespie County, Texas, United States. According to the Handbook of Texas, the community had an estimated population of 75 in 2000. The 1905 Willow City School was added to the National Register of Historic Places in Texas on May 6, 2005.

== Geography ==
Willow City is located along FM 1323 in northeastern Gillespie County, about 12 miles (19 km) northeast of Fredericksburg.

=== Climate ===
The climate in this area is characterized by hot, humid summers and generally mild to cool winters. According to the Köppen climate classification, Willow City has a humid subtropical climate, Cfa on climate maps.

== History ==
The area was first settled before the American Civil War, and it became a gathering point for English-speaking settlers in Gillespie County, mostly inhabited by German speaking settlers around and after the War. Named simply "Willow" in 1877 when the post office was established, the growing community became "Willow City" 10 years later. At the turn of the century, Willow City was home to 132 inhabitants, but this number dropped steadily since then, going as low as 17 in 1964 before settling around 75 since the 1970s.

Willow City was home to the Alfred Pfeil Gin, in which a boiler exploded September 2, 1924, killing two people. The walls of one end of the building were blown out, and one end of the boiler was found more than 100 yards away. Farmer Edgar P. Smith was killed instantly and hurled about 50 yd (46 m). His nude body, missing its legs, was found in the creek. Walter M. Icke was found near the original site of the boiler and died shortly after medical assistance arrived.

== See also ==
- Crabapple
- Loyal Valley
- Cherry Spring
- Sisterdale
