= National Register of Historic Places listings in Ellis County, Texas =

Location of Ellis County in Texas

This is intended to be a complete list of properties and districts listed on the National Register of Historic Places in Ellis County, Texas. There are eight districts, 114 individual properties, and one former property listed on the National Register in the county. Nine individually listed properties are also Recorded Texas Historic Landmarks including one that is also a State Antiquities Landmark while four districts contain additional Recorded Texas Historic Landmarks and one State Antiquities Landmark.

This National Park Service list is complete through NPS recent listings posted May 1, 2026.

== Current listings ==
The locations of National Register properties and districts may be seen in a mapping service provided.

	Name on the Register	Image	Date listed	Location	City or town	Description
1	F.R. Adamson House	F.R. Adamson House	September 24, 1986 (#86002485)	309 University; 32°24′06″N 96°51′15″W	Waxahachie	Historic Resources of Waxahachie MRA
2	J.M. Alderdice House	J.M. Alderdice House	September 24, 1986 (#86002443)	1500 W. Main; 32°23′52″N 96°51′49″W	Waxahachie	Historic Resources of Waxahachie MRA
3	G.H. Alderman House	G.H. Alderman House	September 24, 1986 (#86002446)	317 E. Marvin; 32°23′28″N 96°50′26″W	Waxahachie	Historic Resources of Waxahachie MRA
4	I.R. Allen House	I.R. Allen House	September 25, 1986 (#86002387)	601 N. Dallas; 32°19′53″N 96°37′52″W	Ennis	Historic Resources of Ennis MRA
5	E.K. Atwood House	E.K. Atwood House	September 25, 1986 (#86002504)	605 N. Preston; 32°19′48″N 96°38′02″W	Ennis	Historic Resources of Ennis MRA
6	Barkley-Floyd House	Barkley-Floyd House	September 25, 1986 (#86002389)	709 N. Dallas; 32°19′57″N 96°37′55″W	Ennis	Recorded Texas Historic Landmark; Historic Resources of Ennis MRA
7	Barrington House	Barrington House	September 25, 1986 (#86002365)	204 W. Belknap; 32°19′47″N 96°37′49″W	Ennis	Historic Resources of Ennis MRA
8	J.S. Berry House	J.S. Berry House	September 24, 1986 (#86002386)	201 E. University; 32°23′58″N 96°51′14″W	Waxahachie	Historic Resources of Waxahachie MRA
9	E.T. Boren House	E.T. Boren House	September 25, 1986 (#86002436)	616 W. Denton; 32°19′44″N 96°38′08″W	Ennis	Historic Resources of Ennis MRA
10	Building at 441 East Main	Building at 441 East Main	September 24, 1986 (#86002437)	441 E. Main; 32°23′01″N 96°50′30″W	Waxahachie	Historic Resources of Waxahachie MRA
11	Building at 500–502 East Main	Building at 500–502 East Main	September 24, 1986 (#86002440)	500–502 E. Main; 32°23′00″N 96°50′32″W	Waxahachie	Historic Resources of Waxahachie MRA; demolished between 2008 and 2012
12	T.J. Bullard House	T.J. Bullard House	September 24, 1986 (#86002340)	221 Patrick; 32°23′41″N 96°51′21″W	Waxahachie	Historic Resources of Waxahachie MRA
13	Central Presbyterian Church	Central Presbyterian Church	September 11, 1987 (#86002362)	402 N. College; 32°23′21″N 96°50′41″W	Waxahachie	Historic Resources of Waxahachie MRA
14	Oscar H. Chapman House	Oscar H. Chapman House	September 24, 1986 (#86002479)	201 Overhill; 32°24′14″N 96°50′43″W	Waxahachie	Historic Resources of Waxahachie MRA
15	Joe Cohn House	Joe Cohn House	September 24, 1986 (#86002492)	501 Sycamore; 32°23′59″N 96°50′44″W	Waxahachie	Historic Resources of Waxahachie MRA
16	Cole-Hipp House	Cole-Hipp House	September 24, 1986 (#86002445)	309 E. Marvin; 32°23′30″N 96°50′29″W	Waxahachie	Historic Resources of Waxahachie MRA
17	Coleman-Cole House	Coleman-Cole House	September 24, 1986 (#86002522)	1219 E. Marvin; 32°23′20″N 96°49′40″W	Waxahachie	Historic Resources of Waxahachie MRA
18	Roy Connally House	Roy Connally House	September 24, 1986 (#86002388)	205 E. University; 32°23′59″N 96°51′14″W	Waxahachie	Historic Resources of Waxahachie MRA
19	George C. Dillon House	George C. Dillon House	September 24, 1986 (#86002378)	123 E. University; 32°23′56″N 96°51′15″W	Waxahachie	Historic Resources of Waxahachie MRA
20	G.G. Dunkerly House		September 25, 1986 (#86002364)	607 W. Baylor; 32°19′35″N 96°38′01″W	Ennis	Historic Resources of Ennis MRA
21	D.D. Eastham House	D.D. Eastham House	September 24, 1986 (#86002526)	401 E. Marvin; 32°23′27″N 96°50′23″W	Waxahachie	Historic Resources of Waxahachie MRA
22	Ellis County Courthouse Historic District	Ellis County Courthouse Historic District	April 23, 1975 (#75001971)	Roughly bounded by both sides of Waxahachie Creek N to Union Pacific RR tracks & between both sides of Elm and Flat Sts. 32°23′02″N 96°50′55″W	Waxahachie	Includes State Antiquities Landmark, Recorded Texas Historic Landmarks; Historic Resources of Waxahachie MRA
23	Ennis Commercial Historic District	Ennis Commercial Historic District	September 25, 1986 (#86002547)	Roughly bounded by W. Baylor, N. Main, W. Crockett, and McKinney Sts. 32°19′41″N 96°37′35″W	Ennis	Includes Recorded Texas Historic Landmarks; Historic Resources of Ennis MRA; Boundary increase in 2019 adds 3 buildings.
24	Ennis Cotton Compress	Ennis Cotton Compress	September 25, 1986 (#86002449)	111 E. Lampasas; 32°19′24″N 96°37′22″W	Ennis	Historic Resources of Ennis MRA
25	Ennis High School	Ennis High School	September 25, 1986 (#86002425)	501 N. Gaines; 32°19′42″N 96°38′03″W	Ennis	Historic Resources of Ennis MRA
26	J.R. Erwin House	J.R. Erwin House	September 24, 1986 (#86002520)	414 W. Marvin; 32°23′40″N 96°50′53″W	Waxahachie	Historic Resources of Waxahachie MRA
27	Fain House	Fain House	September 25, 1986 (#86002501)	403 N. Preston; 32°19′42″N 96°37′58″W	Ennis	Historic Resources of Ennis MRA
28	Farrar House		September 25, 1986 (#86002454)	601 S. Main W 32°19′25″N 96°37′28″W	Ennis	Historic Resources of Ennis MRA; demolished
29	Ferris School	Ferris School	December 6, 1990 (#90001858)	411 Gibson; 32°23′36″N 96°51′05″W	Waxahachie	Historic Resources of Waxahachie MRA
30	W.B. Forrest House	W.B. Forrest House	September 24, 1986 (#86002451)	500 Royal; 32°23′29″N 96°50′59″W	Waxahachie	Historic Resources of Waxahachie MRA
31	Dr. L.H. Graham House	Dr. L.H. Graham House	September 24, 1986 (#86002497)	909 W. Marvin; 32°23′47″N 96°51′13″W	Waxahachie	Historic Resources of Waxahachie MRA
32	Highway Garage	Highway Garage	April 18, 2003 (#03000278)	315 W. Main; 32°23′11″N 96°50′58″W	Waxahachie	
33	E.M. Hines House	E.M. Hines House	September 24, 1986 (#86002430)	124 Kaufman; 32°23′07″N 96°50′35″W	Waxahachie	Historic Resources of Waxahachie MRA
34	House at 104 Kaufman	House at 104 Kaufman	September 24, 1986 (#86002417)	104 Kaufman; 32°23′06″N 96°50′41″W	Waxahachie	Historic Resources of Waxahachie MRA; demolished
35	House at 106 East Denton		September 25, 1986 (#86002397)	106 E. Denton; 32°19′57″N 96°37′42″W	Ennis	Historic Resources of Ennis MRA
36	House at 106 Kaufman	House at 106 Kaufman	September 24, 1986 (#86002419)	106 Kaufman; 32°23′06″N 96°50′40″W	Waxahachie	Historic Resources of Waxahachie MRA
37	House at 111 Brown	House at 111 Brown	September 24, 1986 (#86002347)	111 Brown; 32°23′36″N 96°50′38″W	Waxahachie	Historic Resources of Waxahachie MRA
38	House at 111 Williams	House at 111 Williams	September 24, 1986 (#86002476)	111 Williams; 32°23′18″N 96°50′30″W	Waxahachie	Historic Resources of Waxahachie MRA
39	House at 113 East Ross		September 24, 1986 (#86002448)	113 E. Ross; 32°23′44″N 96°50′27″W	Waxahachie	Historic Resources of Waxahachie MRA
40	House at 1301 East Marvin	House at 1301 East Marvin	September 24, 1986 (#86002521)	1301 E. Marvin; 32°23′21″N 96°49′38″W	Waxahachie	Historic Resources of Waxahachie MRA
41	House at 1423 Sycamore	House at 1423 Sycamore	September 24, 1986 (#86002488)	1423 Sycamore; 32°24′16″N 96°51′28″W	Waxahachie	Historic Resources of Waxahachie MRA
42	House at 301 Turner	House at 301 Turner	September 24, 1986 (#86002487)	401 Turner; 32°22′51″N 96°51′17″W	Waxahachie	Historic Resources of Waxahachie MRA
43	House at 320 East Marvin	House at 320 East Marvin	September 24, 1986 (#86002527)	320 E. Marvin; 32°23′26″N 96°50′26″W	Waxahachie	Historic Resources of Waxahachie MRA
44	House at 404 East Crockett	House at 404 East Crockett	September 25, 1986 (#86002379)	404 E. Crockett; 32°19′43″N 96°37′19″W	Ennis	Historic Resources of Ennis MRA
45	House at 418 North College	House at 418 North College	September 24, 1986 (#86002367)	418 N. College; 32°23′24″N 96°50′39″W	Waxahachie	Historic Resources of Waxahachie MRA
46	House at 500 North Main, East	House at 500 North Main, East	September 25, 1986 (#86002439)	500 N. Main E 32°19′54″N 96°37′42″W	Ennis	Historic Resources of Ennis MRA; demolished
47	House at 501 North Grand	House at 501 North Grand	September 24, 1986 (#86002408)	501 N. Grand; 32°24′10″N 96°51′33″W	Waxahachie	Historic Resources of Waxahachie MRA
48	House at 508 North Dallas	House at 508 North Dallas	September 25, 1986 (#86002381)	508 N. Dallas; 32°19′52″N 96°37′50″W	Ennis	Historic Resources of Ennis MRA
49	House at 509 West Brown	House at 509 West Brown	September 25, 1986 (#86002371)	509 W. Brown; 32°19′28″N 96°37′51″W	Ennis	Historic Resources of Ennis MRA
50	House at 512 North Grand	House at 512 North Grand	September 24, 1986 (#86002409)	512 N. Grand; 32°26′01″N 96°51′30″W	Waxahachie	Historic Resources of Waxahachie MRA
51	House at 523 Highland	House at 523 Highland	September 24, 1986 (#86002416)	523 Highland; 32°24′06″N 96°51′26″W	Waxahachie	Historic Resources of Waxahachie MRA
52	House at 625 Cantrell	House at 625 Cantrell	September 24, 1986 (#86002352)	625 Cantrell; 32°22′52″N 96°51′16″W	Waxahachie	Historic Resources of Waxahachie MRA; demolished
53	House at 700 South Rogers	House at 700 South Rogers	September 24, 1986 (#86002344)	700 S. Rogers; 32°22′45″N 96°51′15″W	Waxahachie	Historic Resources of Waxahachie MRA
54	House at 703 South College		September 24, 1986 (#86002372)	703 S. College; 32°22′42″N 96°51′13″W	Waxahachie	Historic Resources of Waxahachie MRA
55	House at 708 East Brown	House at 708 East Brown	September 25, 1986 (#86002368)	708 E. Brown; 32°19′50″N 96°37′10″W	Ennis	Historic Resources of Ennis MRA
56	House at 712 East Marvin	House at 712 East Marvin	September 24, 1986 (#86002525)	712 E. Marvin; 32°23′18″N 96°50′07″W	Waxahachie	Historic Resources of Waxahachie MRA
57	House at 722 West Madison	House at 722 West Madison	September 25, 1986 (#86002426)	722 W. Madison; 32°18′59″N 96°37′43″W	Ennis	Historic Resources of Ennis MRA; demolished
58	House at 802 East Ennis		September 25, 1986 (#86002429)	802 E. Ennis; 32°19′53″N 96°37′12″W	Ennis	Historic Resources of Ennis MRA; demolished
59	House at 803 Cantrell	House at 803 Cantrell	September 24, 1986 (#86002353)	803 Cantrell; 32°22′52″N 96°51′24″W	Waxahachie	Historic Resources of Waxahachie MRA
60	House at 806 South Dallas		September 25, 1986 (#86002393)	806 S. Dallas; 32°19′17″N 96°37′25″W	Ennis	Historic Resources of Ennis MRA
61	House at 807 North Preston		September 25, 1986 (#86002529)	807 N. Preston; 32°19′55″N 96°38′07″W	Ennis	Historic Resources of Ennis MRA
62	House at 810 North Preston		September 25, 1986 (#86002532)	810 N. Preston; 32°19′57″N 96°38′06″W	Ennis	Historic Resources of Ennis MRA
63	House at 816 Cantrell		September 24, 1986 (#86002358)	816 Cantrell; 32°22′56″N 96°51′29″W	Waxahachie	Historic Resources of Waxahachie MRA
64	House at 816 West Water	House at 816 West Water	September 24, 1986 (#86002480)	816 W. Water; 32°23′30″N 96°51′16″W	Waxahachie	Historic Resources of Waxahachie MRA
65	House at 901 Cantrell		September 24, 1986 (#86002360)	901 Cantrell; 32°22′49″N 96°51′39″W	Waxahachie	Historic Resources of Waxahachie MRA
66	Jolesch House	Jolesch House	September 25, 1986 (#86002452)	504 W. Knox; 32°19′36″N 96°37′55″W	Ennis	Historic Resources of Ennis MRA
67	Joshua Chapel A.M.E. Church	Joshua Chapel A.M.E. Church	September 24, 1986 (#86002345)	110 Aiken; 32°22′59″N 96°50′23″W	Waxahachie	Recorded Texas Historic Landmark; Historic Resources of Waxahachie MRA
68	J.D. Kirven House	J.D. Kirven House	September 24, 1986 (#86002489)	601 Sycamore; 32°24′01″N 96°50′48″W	Waxahachie	Historic Resources of Waxahachie MRA
69	William Koger House	William Koger House	September 24, 1986 (#86002435)	409 Kaufman; 32°23′15″N 96°50′24″W	Waxahachie	Historic Resources of Waxahachie MRA
70	Samuel Langsford House	Samuel Langsford House	September 24, 1986 (#86002523)	1208 E. Marvin; 32°23′17″N 96°49′42″W	Waxahachie	Historic Resources of Waxahachie MRA
71	William Lewis House	William Lewis House	September 24, 1986 (#86002524)	1201 E. Marvin; 32°23′19″N 96°49′44″W	Waxahachie	Historic Resources of Waxahachie MRA
72	Matthews-Atwood House	Matthews-Atwood House	September 25, 1986 (#86002537)	307 N. Sherman; 32°19′43″N 96°37′54″W	Ennis	Historic Resources of Ennis MRA
73	Matthews-Templeton House	Matthews-Templeton House	September 25, 1986 (#86002410)	606 W. Denton; 32°19′46″N 96°38′07″W	Ennis	Historic Resources of Ennis MRA
74	McCanless-Williams House		September 25, 1986 (#86002540)	402 W. Tyler; 32°19′55″N 96°38′03″W	Ennis	Historic Resources of Ennis MRA
75	McCartney House	McCartney House	September 24, 1986 (#86002519)	603 W. Marvin; 32°23′41″N 96°51′01″W	Waxahachie	Historic Resources of Waxahachie MRA
76	Meredith-McDowal House		September 25, 1986 (#86002500)	701 N. Gaines; 32°19′49″N 96°38′07″W	Ennis	Historic Resources of Ennis MRA
77	Moore House	Moore House	September 25, 1986 (#86002398)	400 W. Denton; 32°19′50″N 96°38′00″W	Ennis	Recorded Texas Historic Landmark; Historic Resources of Ennis MRA
78	W.B. Moore House	W.B. Moore House	September 24, 1986 (#86002447)	912 E. Marvin; 32°23′15″N 96°49′57″W	Waxahachie	Historic Resources of Waxahachie MRA
79	Morton House		September 25, 1986 (#86002457)	1007 N. McKinney; 32°20′04″N 96°38′04″W	Ennis	Historic Resources of Ennis MRA
80	National Compress Company Building	National Compress Company Building	September 11, 1987 (#86002400)	503 S. Flat; 32°22′52″N 96°50′45″W	Waxahachie	Historic Resources of Waxahachie MRA
81	Neal House		September 25, 1986 (#86002505)	704 N. Preston; 32°19′52″N 96°38′03″W	Ennis	Historic Resources of Ennis MRA
82	North Rogers Street Historic District	North Rogers Street Historic District	September 24, 1986 (#86002465)	500–600 blocks of N. Rogers, 500–600 blocks of N. Monroe, and 100–200 blocks of W. Marvin Sts. 32°23′27″N 96°50′45″W	Waxahachie	Historic Resources of Waxahachie MRA
83	Joe Novy House	Joe Novy House	September 25, 1986 (#86002376)	401 N. Clay; 32°19′38″N 96°38′06″W	Ennis	Historic Resources of Ennis MRA
84	Old City Mills	Old City Mills	September 25, 1986 (#86002431)	212 E. Ennis and 108 E. Brown; 32°19′41″N 96°37′32″W	Ennis	Historic Resources of Ennis MRA
85	Oldham Avenue Historic District	Oldham Avenue Historic District	September 24, 1986 (#86002461)	Oldham Ave. between N. Jackson and Bethel Sts. 32°23′16″N 96°50′32″W	Waxahachie	Includes Recorded Texas Historic Landmarks; Historic Resources of Waxahachie MRA
86	Mary and Frank Oldham House	Mary and Frank Oldham House	September 24, 1986 (#86002496)	910 W. Marvin; 32°23′49″N 96°51′12″W	Waxahachie	Historic Resources of Waxahachie MRA
87	Paillet House		September 24, 1986 (#86002339)	800 S. College; 32°22′41″N 96°51′18″W	Waxahachie	Historic Resources of Waxahachie MRA
88	Marshall T. Patrick House	Marshall T. Patrick House	September 24, 1986 (#86002341)	233 Patrick; 32°23′43″N 96°51′20″W	Waxahachie	Historic Resources of Waxahachie MRA
89	M.S. Payne House	M.S. Payne House	September 24, 1986 (#86002413)	521 N. Grand; 32°24′14″N 96°51′31″W	Waxahachie	Historic Resources of Waxahachie MRA
90	E.F. Phillips House	E.F. Phillips House	September 24, 1986 (#86002498)	902 W. Marvin; 32°23′48″N 96°51′10″W	Waxahachie	Historic Resources of Waxahachie MRA
91	Plumhoff House	Plumhoff House	September 24, 1986 (#86002342)	612 S. Rogers; 32°22′48″N 96°51′12″W	Waxahachie	Historic Resources of Waxahachie MRA
92	Mary Ralston House	Mary Ralston House	September 24, 1986 (#86002375)	116 E. University; 32°23′55″N 96°51′14″W	Waxahachie	Historic Resources of Waxahachie MRA
93	Ransom House	Ransom House	September 25, 1986 (#86002456)	501 N. McKinney; 32°19′48″N 96°37′53″W	Ennis	Historic Resources of Ennis MRA
94	Raphael House	Raphael House	September 25, 1986 (#86002428)	500 W. Ennis; 32°19′34″N 96°37′53″W	Ennis	Historic Resources of Ennis MRA
95	M.B. Ray House	M.B. Ray House	September 24, 1986 (#86002477)	401 N. Monroe; 32°23′22″N 96°50′53″W	Waxahachie	Historic Resources of Waxahachie MRA
96	W.B. Reinmiller House	W.B. Reinmiller House	September 24, 1986 (#86002444)	206 E. Marvin; 32°23′30″N 96°50′30″W	Waxahachie	Historic Resources of Waxahachie MRA
97	Paris Q. Rockett House	Paris Q. Rockett House	September 24, 1986 (#86002343)	321 E. University; 32°24′08″N 96°51′10″W	Waxahachie	Historic Resources of Waxahachie MRA
98	Rosemont House	Rosemont House	July 8, 1982 (#82004504)	701 S. Rogers; 32°22′44″N 96°51′14″W	Waxahachie	Recorded Texas Historic Landmark; Historic Resources of Waxahachie MRA
99	Saint Paul's Episcopal Church	Saint Paul's Episcopal Church	September 24, 1986 (#86002495)	308 N. Monroe; 32°23′21″N 96°50′52″W	Waxahachie	Recorded Texas Historic Landmark; Historic Resources of Waxahachie MRA
100	James S. Sanderson House	James S. Sanderson House	September 25, 1986 (#86002420)	201 N. Gaines; 32°19′35″N 96°37′58″W	Ennis	Historic Resources of Ennis MRA
101	Southwestern Assemblies of God University	Southwestern Assemblies of God University	September 11, 1987 (#86002458)	1200 blk. of Sycamore; 32°24′15″N 96°51′11″W	Waxahachie	Historic Resources of Waxahachie MRA
102	Sharp House	Sharp House	September 25, 1986 (#86002423)	208 N. Gaines; 32°19′37″N 96°37′57″W	Ennis	Historic Resources of Ennis MRA
103	O.B. Sims House	O.B. Sims House	September 24, 1986 (#86002441)	1408 W. Main; 32°23′52″N 96°51′48″W	Waxahachie	Historic Resources of Waxahachie MRA
104	John Solon House	John Solon House	September 11, 1987 (#86002453)	617 Solon Rd. 32°25′04″N 96°51′10″W	Waxahachie	Historic Resources of Waxahachie MRA
105	State Highway 34 Bridge at the Trinity River		October 10, 1996 (#96001109)	TX 34 at the Ellis and Kaufman Cnty. line 32°25′36″N 96°27′45″W	Rosser	Replaced 1996; extended into Kaufman County; Historic Bridges of Texas, 1866-1945 MPS
106	Jesse and Mary Story House		September 25, 1986 (#86002373)	510 W. Brown; 32°19′30″N 96°37′50″W	Ennis	Historic Resources of Ennis MRA
107	Strickland-Sawyer House	Strickland-Sawyer House	October 18, 1984 (#84000168)	500 Oldham St. 32°23′15″N 96°50′31″W	Waxahachie	Recorded Texas Historic Landmark; Historic Resources of Waxahachie MRA; part of Oldham Avenue Historic District
108	Telfair House	Telfair House	September 25, 1986 (#86002473)	209 N. Preston; 32°19′38″N 96°37′55″W	Ennis	Historic Resources of Ennis MRA
109	Judge M.B. Templeton House	Judge M.B. Templeton House	September 24, 1986 (#86002402)	203 N. Grand; 32°23′54″N 96°51′45″W	Waxahachie	Historic Resources of Waxahachie MRA
110	D.H. Thompson House	D.H. Thompson House	September 24, 1986 (#86002433)	312 Kaufman; 32°23′11″N 96°50′27″W	Waxahachie	Historic Resources of Waxahachie MRA
111	Trippet-Shive House	Trippet-Shive House	September 24, 1986 (#86002404)	209 N. Grand; 32°23′55″N 96°51′44″W	Waxahachie	Recorded Texas Historic Landmark; Historic Resources of Waxahachie MRA
112	Richard Vickery House	Richard Vickery House	September 25, 1986 (#86002528)	1104 E. Marvin; 32°23′17″N 96°49′45″W	Waxahachie	Historic Resources of Waxahachie MRA
113	Waxahachie Chautauqua Building	Waxahachie Chautauqua Building	May 3, 1974 (#74002070)	Getzendaner Park; 32°23′46″N 96°51′58″W	Waxahachie	State Antiquities Landmark, Recorded Texas Historic Landmark; Historic Resources of Waxahachie MRA
114	Waxahachie Lumber Company	Waxahachie Lumber Company	September 11, 1987 (#86002424)	123 Kaufman; 32°23′09″N 96°50′37″W	Waxahachie	Historic Resources of Waxahachie MRA
115	Weatherford House	Weatherford House	September 25, 1986 (#86002503)	501 N. Preston; 32°19′45″N 96°38′01″W	Ennis	Historic Resources of Ennis MRA
116	John M. Weekley House	John M. Weekley House	September 25, 1986 (#86002406)	510 W. Denton; 32°19′47″N 96°38′04″W	Ennis	Historic Resources of Ennis MRA
117	West End Historic District	West End Historic District	September 24, 1986 (#86002474)	Roughly bounded by Central, W. Water, Monroe, Madison and W. Jefferson; 32°23′26″N 96°51′22″W	Waxahachie	Includes Recorded Texas Historic Landmarks; Historic Resources of Waxahachie MRA
118	West Marvin Avenue-Patrick Street Historic District		August 27, 2024 (#100010757)	Roughly bounded by North Spencer Street to the west, the rear property lines of the resources fronting the north side of West Marvin Avenue to the north, Ferris Avenue to the east, and Water Street and West Parks Avenue to the south 32°23′39″N 96°50′55″W	Waxahachie	
119	Porter L. Williams House	Porter L. Williams House	September 24, 1986 (#86002383)	200 E. University; 32°23′57″N 96°51′13″W	Waxahachie	Historic Resources of Waxahachie MRA
120	Williams-Erwin House	Williams-Erwin House	July 7, 1978 (#78002926)	412 W. Marvin St. 32°23′40″N 96°50′52″W	Waxahachie	Recorded Texas Historic Landmark; Historic Resources of Waxahachie MRA
121	Pat Witten House	Pat Witten House	September 24, 1986 (#86002349)	204 Brown; 32°23′41″N 96°50′33″W	Waxahachie	Historic Resources of Waxahachie MRA
122	Wyatt Street Shotgun House Historic District	Wyatt Street Shotgun House Historic District	September 24, 1986 (#86002463)	E side 300 blk. of Wyatt St. 32°23′05″N 96°50′21″W	Waxahachie	Historic Resources of Waxahachie MRA

== Former listing ==
	Name on the Register	Image	Date listed	Date removed	Location	City or town	Description
1	H & TC Railroad Division Yard Shop		September 25, 1986 (#86002491)	September 28, 1987	1311 N. Main W 32°20′15″N 96°38′06″W	Ennis	Houston and Texas Central Railway; Historic Resources of Ennis MRA

== See also ==
- National Register of Historic Places listings in Texas
- Recorded Texas Historic Landmarks in Ellis County
