= William Lewis House =

William Lewis House may refer to:

- William H. Lewis Model House, listed on the National Register of Historic Places (NRHP) in Portland, Oregon
- William Lewis House (Waxahachie, Texas), listed on the NRHP in Waxahachie, Texas
- Lewis-Williams House, listed on the NRHP in Hudson, Wisconsin
