= West End Historic District (Waxahachie, Texas) =

Historic district in Texas, United States

- U.S. National Register of Historic Places
- U.S. Historic district
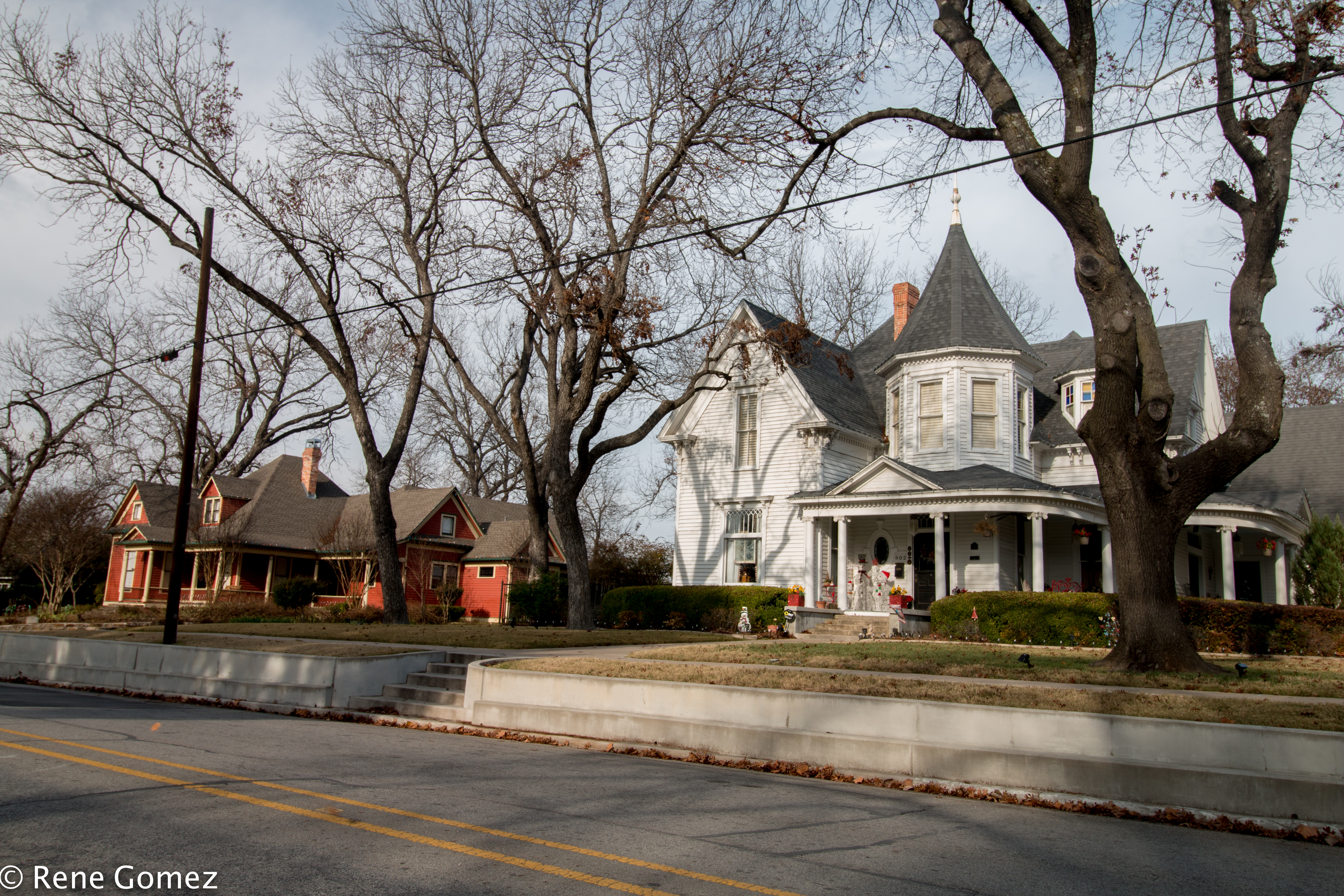
- West End district homes in 2017

- Location within Texas Location within the United States
- Location: Roughly bounded by Central, W. Water, Monroe, Madison and W. Jefferson, Waxahachie, Texas
- Coordinates: 32°23′26″N 96°51′22″W
- Area: 77 acres (31 ha)
- Built: 1889
- Architect: S. Wemyes Smith, Et al.
- Architectural style: Classical Revival, Queen Anne
- MPS: Waxahachie MRA
- NRHP reference No.: 86002474
- Added to NRHP: September 24, 1986

The West End Historic District in Waxahachie, Texas is a 77-acre (31 ha) historic district that was listed on the National Register of Historic Places in 1986. It is mainly seven blocks of W. Main St. and four blocks of W. Jefferson St., and includes properties on cross streets as well (see map on page 67 of NRHP document).

It includes Classical Revival and Queen Anne architecture.

Named buildings included in the district include:

- Sims Library and Lyceum (photo #72 on page 35), Classical Revival, designed by architect S. Weymes Smith
- F. Lee Hawkins House (photo #73 on page 37), L-plan Victorian made more formal by two-story portico with massive Corinthian-capped columns
- E. P. Hawkins House, 200 S. Hawkins St. (photo #74 on page 39), L-plan Victorian made more formal by two-story portico with massive Corinthian-capped columns
- Mahoney-Thompson House (photo #75 on page 41)
- Dunlap-Simpson House (c.1891), 1203 W. Main St. (photo #78 on page 47), Classical Revival, built by Connecticut contractor Dennis Mahoney for Judge Oscar E. Dunlap, longtime president of Waxahachie National Bank. It is a 2 1/2-story house with Queen Anne detailing and a three-story tower.
- Dunlap House, 1203 W. Main, (c. 1891. Dunlap-Simpson House.
- Harrison House, 717 W. Main St. (photo #79 on page 49), with Mission-style parapet
- First Presbyterian Church, 501 W. Main St. (photo #80 on page 51)
- Chapman House, 903 W. Main St. (photo #81 on page 53)
- Hines House, 813 W. Main St. (photo #82 on page 55)
- Chaska House, 716 W. Main St. (photo #84 on page 59).

== See also ==
- National Register of Historic Places listings in Ellis County, Texas
