= Chautauqua Auditorium (Waxahachie, Texas) =

- Waxahachie Chautauqua Building
- U.S. National Register of Historic Places
- Texas State Antiquities Landmark
- Recorded Texas Historic Landmark
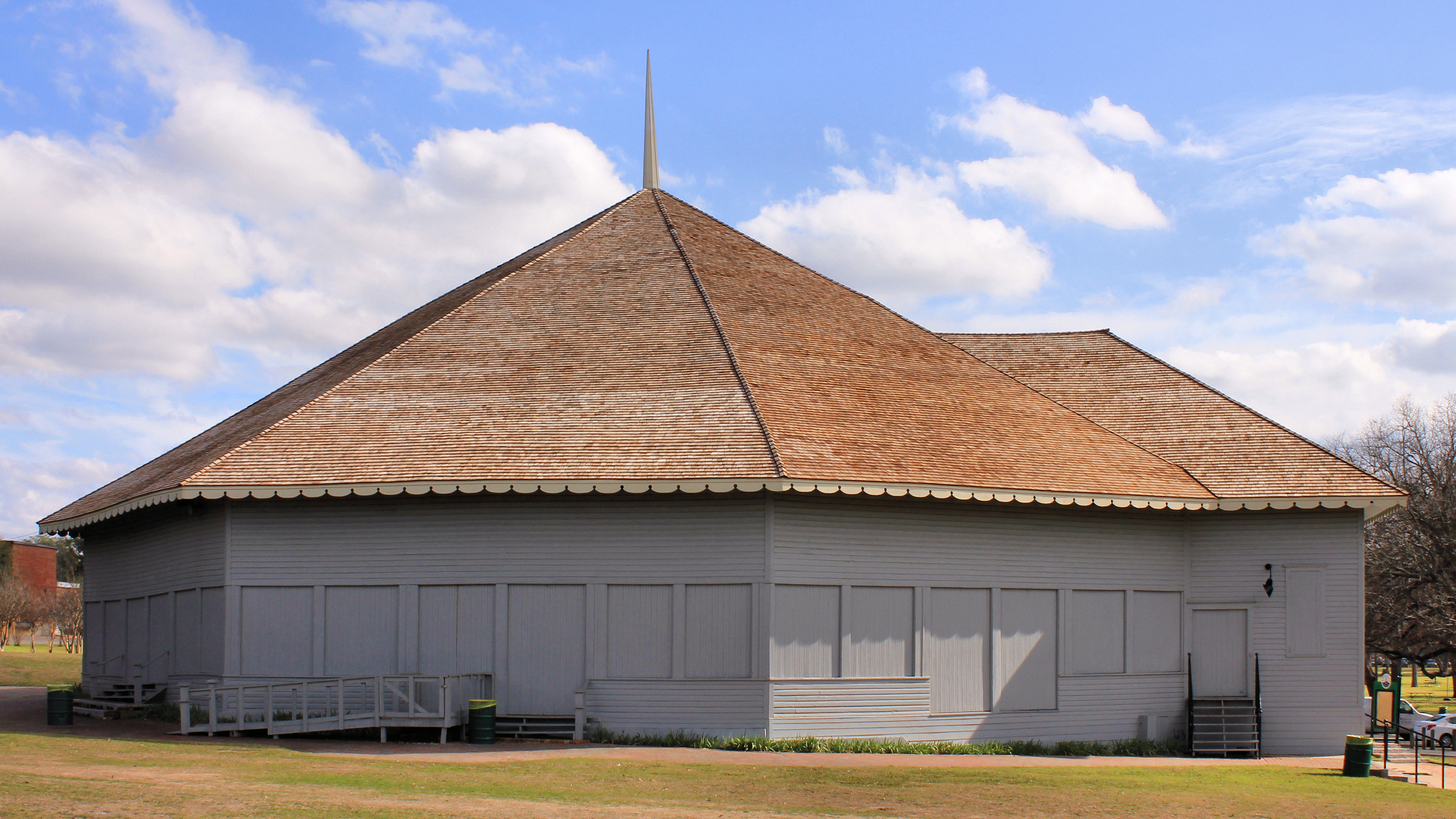
- Chautauqua Building in 2016

- Location within Texas Location within the United States
- Location: Getzendaner Park, Waxahachie, Texas
- Coordinates: 32°23′41″N 96°51′59″W
- Area: 0.3 acres (0.12 ha)
- Built: 1902
- MPS: Waxahachie MRA
- NRHP reference No.: 74002070
- TSAL No.: 8200000230
- RTHL No.: 7077

Significant dates
- Added to NRHP: May 3, 1974
- Designated TSAL: January 1, 1981
- Designated RTHL: 1972

The Chautauqua Auditorium is a performance hall located in Getzendaner Memorial Park, in Waxahachie, Texas. It was built in 1902 and listed on the National Register of Historic Places on May 3, 1974. The hall seats 2500 and is noted for being an octagonal building. The auditorium hosts performances of the Fort Worth Symphony Orchestra as well as many country music and other shows.

== History ==
The Chautauqua Auditorium was built by the Waxahachie Chautauqua Park Association in 1902 to hold crowds for the annual Chautauqua gatherings that had been meeting in Waxahachie since 1899. Well known speakers and performers, including William Jennings Bryan and Will Rogers, performed in the auditorium.

The hall was renovated in 1974. In 1977 it hosted the Open Road Music Festival.

== See also ==
- List of octagonal buildings and structures in the United States
- National Register of Historic Places listings in Ellis County, Texas
- Recorded Texas Historic Landmarks in Ellis County
