= Joshua Chapel A.M.E. Church =

Historic church in Texas, United States

- U.S. National Register of Historic Places
- Recorded Texas Historic Landmark
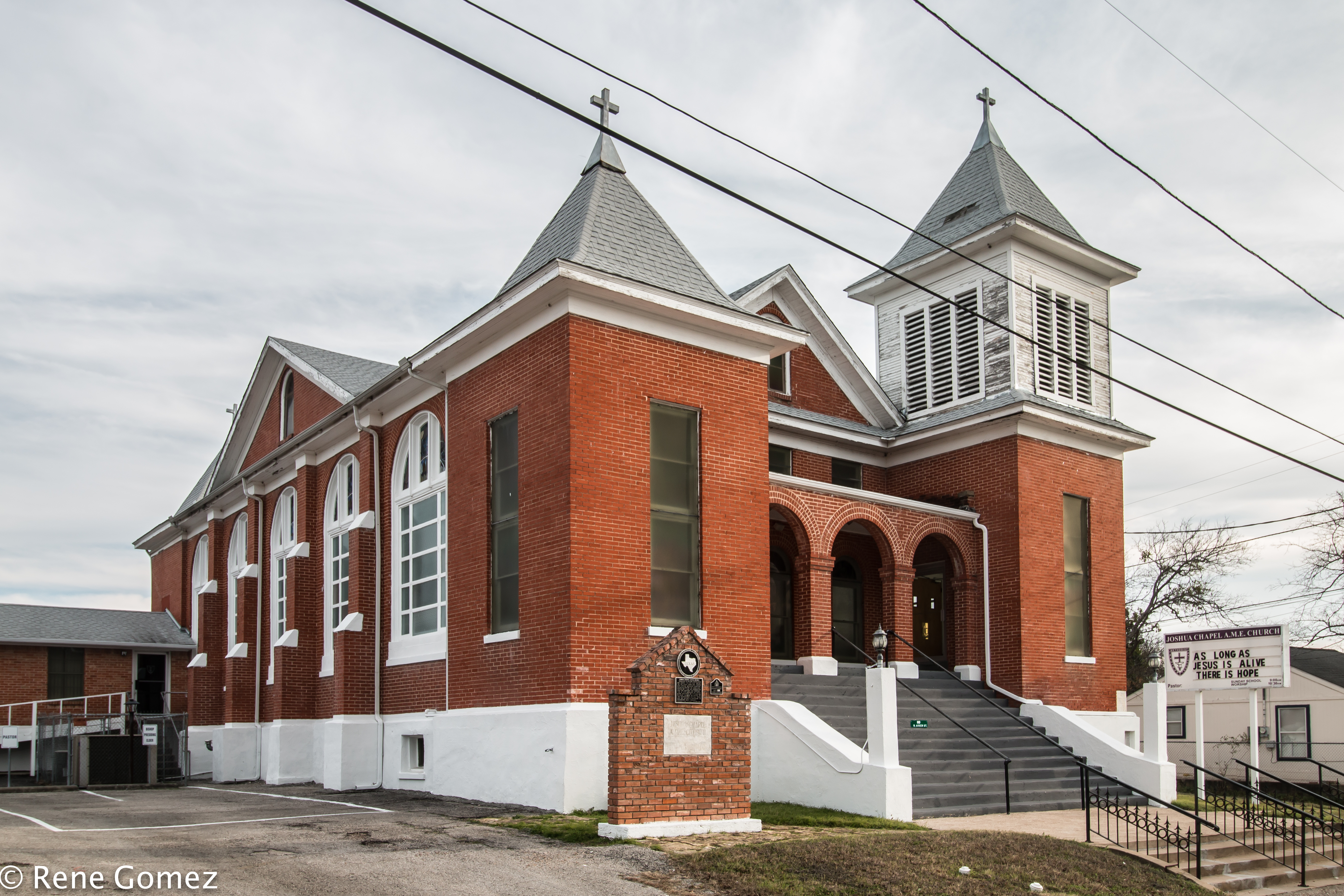

- Location within Texas Location within the United States
- Location: 110 N. Aiken St. Waxahachie, Texas
- Coordinates: 32.38311°N 96.8395°W
- Area: less than one acre
- Built: 1917
- Built by: George Powell
- Architect: William Sidney Pittman
- Architectural style: Late Gothic Revival
- MPS: Waxahachie MRA
- NRHP reference No.: 86002345
- RTHL No.: 7070

Significant dates
- Added to NRHP: September 24, 1986
- Designated RTHL: 1984

Joshua Chapel A.M.E. Church is a historic church at 110 N. Aiken St. Waxahachie, Texas.

It was built in 1917 and added to the National Register in 1986.

== Photo gallery ==
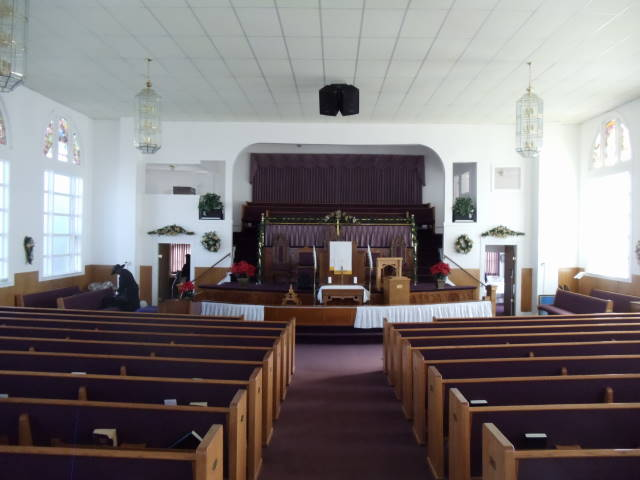

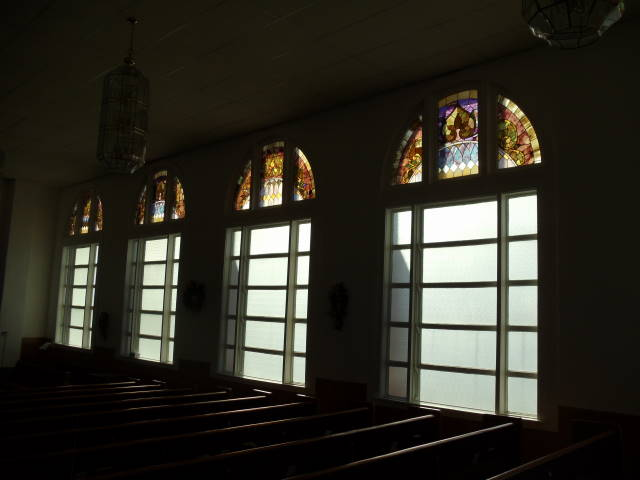

== See also ==
- National Register of Historic Places listings in Ellis County, Texas
- Recorded Texas Historic Landmarks in Ellis County
