= Mathilda Wehmeyer House and German-American Kindergarten School =

Mathilda Wehmeyer German-American Kindergarten School
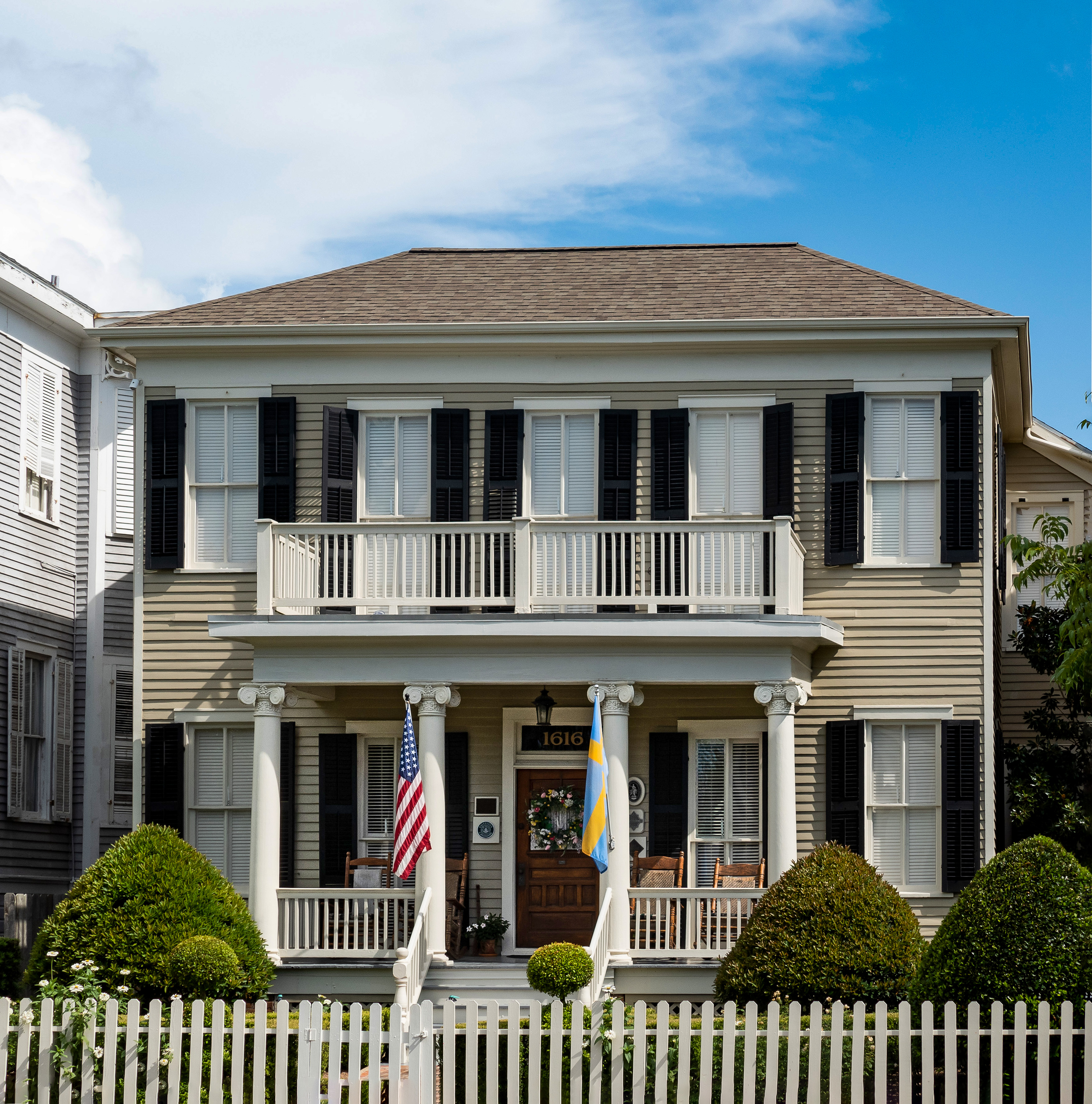
- Mathilda Wehmeyer German-American Kindergarten School

- Mathilda Wehmeyer German-American Kindergarten School (the United States)
- 29°18′18″N 94°47′8″W
- Location: 1616 Winnie St., Galveston, Texas

History
- Built: 1887

Site notes
- Architectural style: Italianate

Recorded Texas Historic Landmark
- Designated: 2017
- Reference no.: 18647

The Mathilda Wehmeyer House and German-American Kindergarten School is a two-story building located at 1616 Winnie St. (Avenue G) in Galveston, Texas. Built in 1887, the building housed a school operated by German immigrant Mathilda Wehmeyer between 1891 and 1898.

== Mathilda Wehmeyer ==
Mathilda Wehmeyer was born in Bremen, Germany in 1839. She immigrated to the United States in 1857, first settling in Baton Rouge, Louisiana to join her sister Elizabeth and Elizabeth’s husband, Theodore Goldmann. Eventually, the Goldmann family grew to include eight children. Sometime prior to 1870, the family, including Wehmeyer, relocated to Galveston, Texas. In 1871, when they were first recorded in a Galveston city directory, Theodore was working as a watchmaker and the family lived on Church (Avenue F), between 27th and 28th Streets.

In 1870, shortly after arriving in Galveston, Wehmeyer advertised her services as a teacher in the Galveston Daily News:

Miss M. Wehmeyer, assisted by a thoroughly competent FRENCH and ENGLISH teacher, late of New Orleans, will re-open her school in the building formerly occupied by Mrs. Bardine, corner Ave H and 18th, Monday next. References O. Gareissen, Dr. E. Goldmann, E. Keppler.

Later advertisements describe her school as a kindergarten, a term by then well known to Americans as representing a specific set of principles for early childhood education. These principles, formalized in Germany by Friedrich Fröbel, emphasized the importance of playing games as a means for children to learn about the world. In establishing her school, Wehmeyer followed Frobel's philosophy, as developed in America by educators Margarethe Schurz, a student of Frobel in her native Germany, Elizabeth Peabody, and Susan Blow.

=== Early Operations and Relocation to 1616 Winnie ===
Wehmeyer operated her school from the corner of 18th Street and Ball (Avenue H) throughout the 1870s. As of 1880, Galveston had two schools catering to its German-American population. The German Lutheran School, operated by the First Evangelical Lutheran Church, had fifty students. Wehmeyer's school, with twenty students, was successful enough to warrant the purchase of a house and lot at 1616 Winnie. Wehmeyer bought the property from Anna Norris, a widow, for $200. Between 1880 and 1885, Wehmeyer lived in the building and operated her school on the premises.

=== 1885 Fire: Destruction and Rebuilding ===
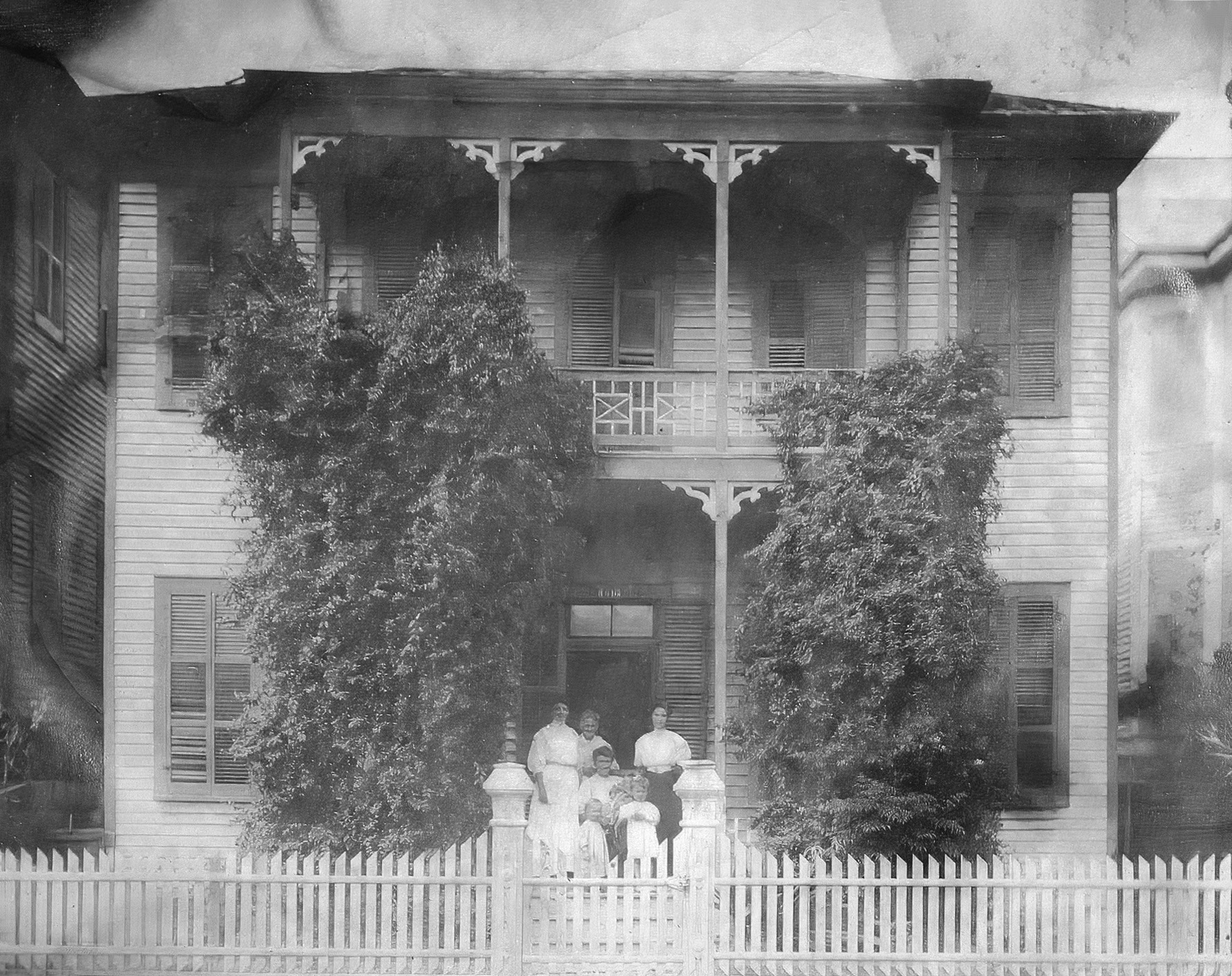
Wehmeyer house historic (edit)

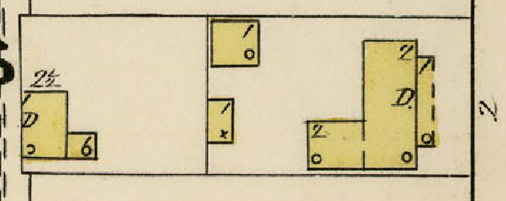
The footprint of the Wehmeyer House and German-American Kindergarten School as seen in an 1889 Sanborn fire insurance map.

The school operated from 1616 Winnie until November 1885, when a fire burned through forty blocks on the east side of Galveston. Beginning at Vulcan Ironworks at the intersection of 16th Street and Strand (Avenue B), the fire moved eastward and completely destroyed the 1600 block of Winnie. Her house and school destroyed, Wehmeyer lived elsewhere between 1885 and 1891. In 1890, she moved in with her niece, Emilia, the daughter of Elizabeth Goldmann, and Emilia’s husband, Alfred Muller, who was one of the most prominent architects in the city.

Soon after the 1885 fire, Wehmeyer commenced plans for a new building at 1616 Winnie. By 1887, construction was complete on a two-story, wood-frame house with a one-story front porch. Twentieth-century projects altered the front porch, but the front façade’s five bays and the hipped roof are likely remnants of the building’s original design. The symmetry and restrained use of details indicate a conservative approach when compared to the more articulated examples from the East End during this period. The style of the house has been characterized as "conservative Italianate." Between 1887 and 1891, Wehmeyer leased the new building to various tenants.

== The German-American Kindergarten School ==
In 1891, Wehmeyer announced the reopening of her school with an advertisement in the Galveston Daily News. She continued to operate the school from the site until 1898, and she lived in the building until 1900 when she was displaced by the 1900 Galveston Hurricane. She eventually returned to the home of her niece, Emilia Muller, by then widowed and living with her son Alfred Muller, Jr. at 1512 22nd Street. She died there in 1903.

=== After the 1900 Hurricane ===
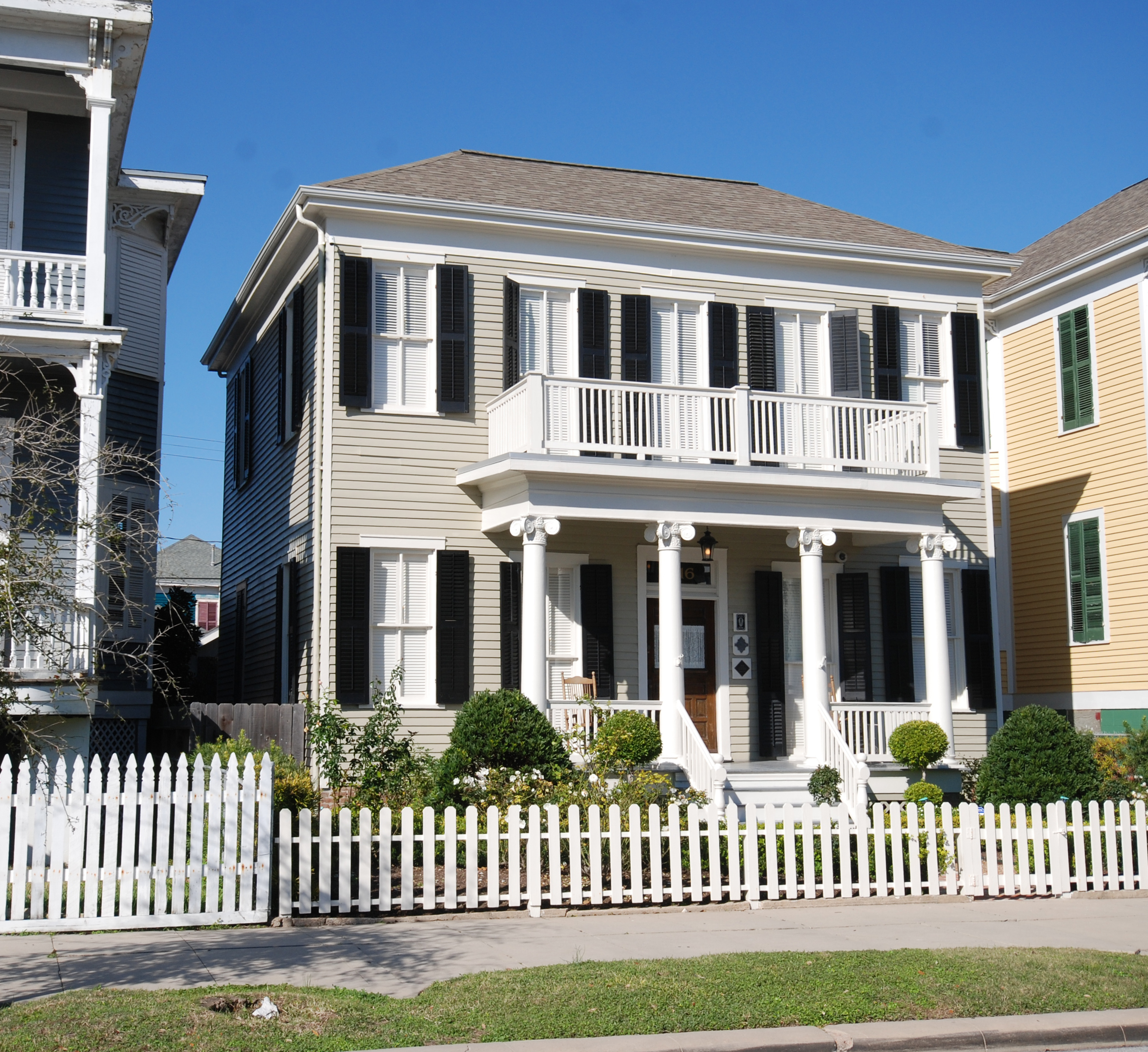
The Mathilda Wehmeyer House and German-American Kindergarten School after post-Hurricane Ike rehabilitation.

While the 1900 Hurricane caused enough damage to displace the then sixty-one-year-old Wehmeyer, it did not destroy her building at 1616 Winnie. She retained ownership of the house until 1902, when she sold it to Worthy Boyd, a clerk in the cotton industry. Boyd leased the building to several different tenants, often simultaneously. The Galveston City Directory lists the following residents on the property in 1919 alone: businessman William H. Pohlig, his wife and their two children; Linnie B. Stallings, a widow and curator of the Pathology Museum at the University of Texas Medical Branch; Elizabeth Butcher, a pathology technician at UTMB; Ella Woodyard, a music teacher; and longshoreman William McWillie and his wife, a cook at a neighboring property. In 1909, Boyd remodeled the house, reconfiguring the front porch as illustrated in a 1912 Sanborn fire insurance map.

In 1922, Boyd sold the property to William H. Pohlig, a German American who had lived in the house with his family as tenants since 1916. Pohlig worked for various business interests of Galveston banker J.W. Jokusch. At various times, he managed the Interstate Chemical Company and the Oleander Feed Store, which he later owned. Pohlig, his wife Anne, and their children, lived in the building for over fifty years. After the deaths of William (1961) and Anne (1977), the house had several different residents during the 1980s and 1990s. In 2007, current owners purchased the building and completed a rehabilitation project in 2008, just days prior to the landfall of Hurricane Ike. The second rehabilitation project was completed in 2009. In 2012, the City of Galveston designated the building as a City Landmark.

== See also ==
- Recorded Texas Historic Landmarks in Galveston County
