= Saint Paul's Episcopal Church (Waxahachie, Texas) =

Historic church in Texas, United States

- U.S. National Register of Historic Places
- Recorded Texas Historic Landmark
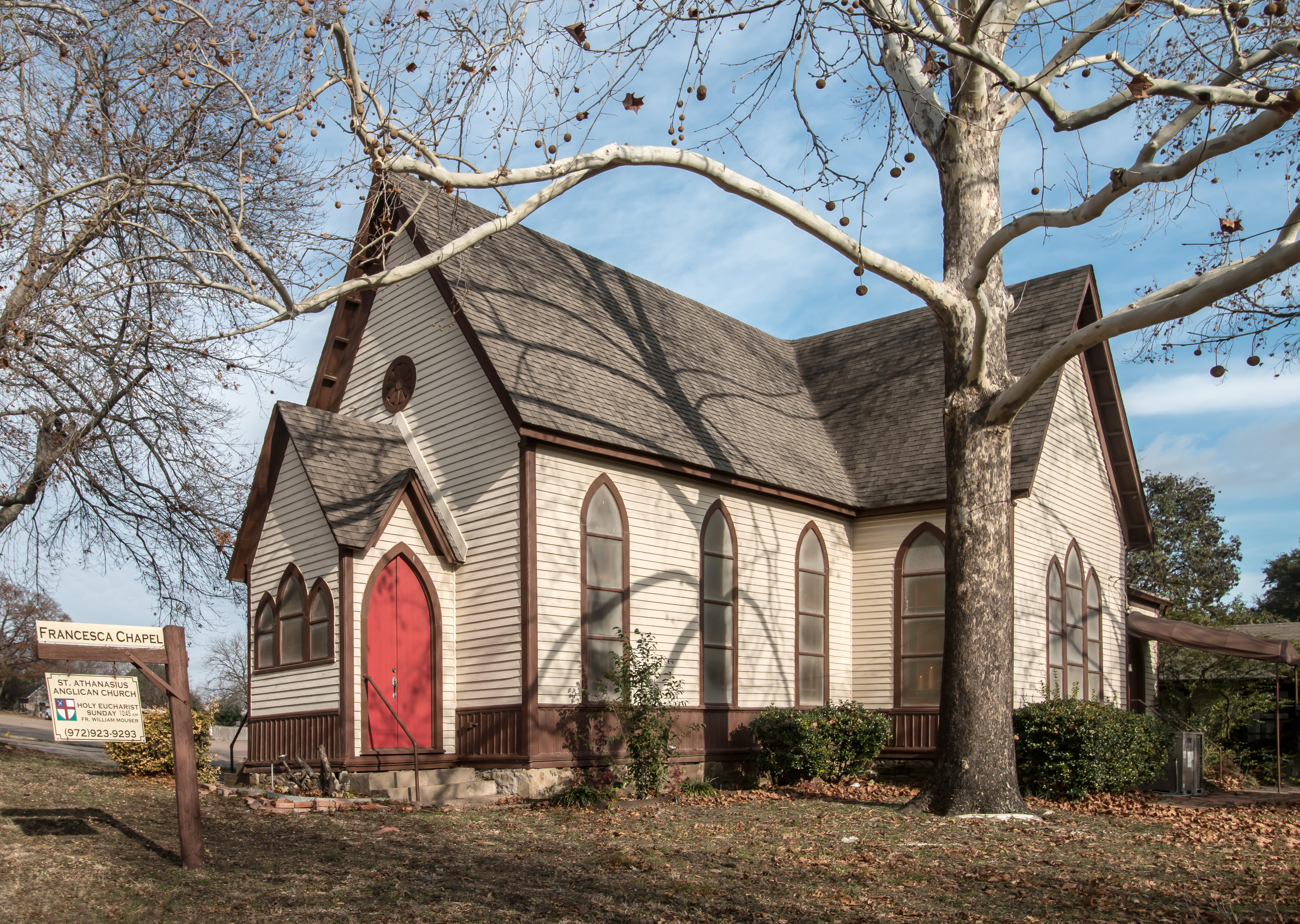
- Saint Paul's Church in 2017

- Location within Texas Location within the United States
- Location: 308 N. Monroe, Waxahachie, Texas
- Coordinates: 32°23′18″N 96°50′12″W
- Area: less than one acre
- Built: 1885
- Architectural style: Gothic Revival
- Website: St. Paul Church
- MPS: Waxahachie MRA
- NRHP reference No.: 86002495
- RTHL No.: 7062

Significant dates
- Added to NRHP: September 24, 1986
- Designated RTHL: 1965

Saint Paul's Episcopal Church is a historic church building at 308 N. Monroe in Waxahachie, Texas.

The Gothic Revival church building was constructed in 1885 and added to the National Register of Historic Places in 1986.

== See also ==
- National Register of Historic Places listings in Ellis County, Texas
- Recorded Texas Historic Landmarks in Ellis County
