= William Lewis House (Waxahachie, Texas) =

Historic house in Texas, United States

- U.S. National Register of Historic Places
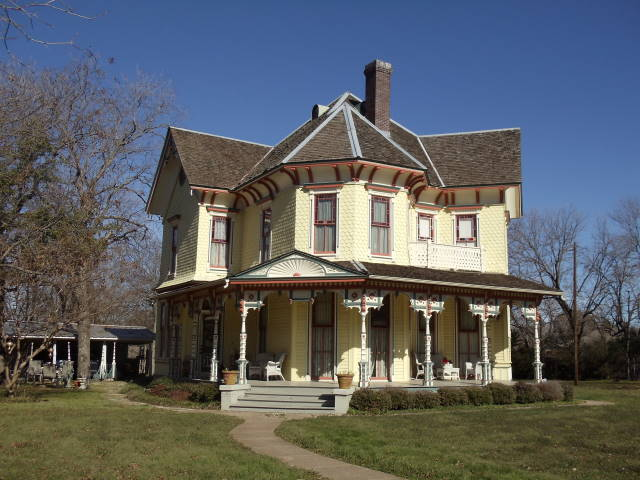
- Lewis House in 2011

- Location within Texas Location within the United States
- Location: 1201 E. Marvin, Waxahachie, Texas
- Coordinates: 32°23′19″N 96°49′44″W
- Area: less than one acre
- Built: 1888
- Architectural style: Queen Anne
- MPS: Waxahachie MRA
- NRHP reference No.: 86002524
- Added to NRHP: September 24, 1986

William Lewis House in Waxahachie, Texas, United States, is a Queen Anne house built in 1888. It was listed on the National Register of Historic Places in 1986.

It is a two-story asymmetric wood-frame building with weatherboard siding and jig-sawn brackets supporting its roof. It was listed on the National Register along with many other Waxahatchie properties identified as historic resources in a 1986 study. The house was deemed to be an "outstanding locally significant representative of Queen Anne" style.

== See also ==
- National Register of Historic Places listings in Ellis County, Texas
