= List of Recorded Texas Historic Landmarks (Eastland-Gray) =

The following is a partial list of Recorded Texas Historic Landmarks (RTHLs) arranged by county as designated by the Texas Historical Commission and local county historical commissions in Texas. This page includes RTHLs in the following counties: Eastland, Ector, Edwards, El Paso, Ellis, Erath, Falls, Fannin, Fayette, Fisher, Floyd, Foard, Fort Bend, Franklin, Freestone, Frio, Gaines, Galveston, Garza, Gillespie, Glasscock, Goliad, Gonzales, and Gray.

Recorded Texas Historic Landmarks listed by county
Anderson-Callahan • Cameron-Duval • Eastland-Gray • Grayson-Hudspeth • Hunt-Martin • Mason-Rusk • Sabine-Travis • Trinity-Zavala

KEY

Landmarks with multiple historic designations are colored according to their highest designation within the following hierarchy.

⁕ Listed individually on the National Register of Historic Places (NRHP) as a National Historic Landmark
⁂ Listed on the NRHP as a contributing property of a National Historic Landmark District
† Listed individually on the NRHP
‡ Listed as a contributing property of an NRHP Historic District
§ Listed individually as or as part of a State Historic Site
# Listed individually as or as part of a State Antiquities Landmark

== Eastland County ==
Registered Texas Historic Landmark	Image	Marker number	Physical address	Nearest city	Year designated	Description
Burkett House		11852	1301 S. Mulberry St. 32°23′20″N 98°49′13″W	Eastland	1998	
Carbon City Jail		17695	Dirt road leading from N. Main St. N of post office to S end of N. Fifth St. 32°16′17″N 98°49′41″W	Carbon	2013	
Carbon Methodist Church Building		12542	201 W. Anthracite St. 32°16′12″N 98°49′51″W	Carbon	1996	Avenue D and Anthracite St.
Connellee-Majestic Theatre		1040	108 N. Lamar St. 32°24′8″N 98°49′9″W	Eastland	1988	
Eastland County Courthouse		16983	100 W. Main St. 32°24′5″N 98°49′7″W	Eastland	2007	
First National Bank‡		1782	708 Conrad Hilton Blvd. 32°23′18″N 98°58′47″W	Cisco	1967	
Old Mobley Hotel†‡	More images	3430	104 E. Fourth St. 32°23′30″N 98°58′51″W	Cisco	1970	
Penn House		3981	0.8 mi. N of FM 2945 past railroad bridge 2.5 mi. W of Cisco 32°23′50″N 99°1′57″W	Cisco vicinity	1988	On private property, from Cisco take FM 2945 west about 2.5 miles; go over bridge over railroad tracks. Then turn north on dirt road, about .8 mile to house.
Ranger Post Office		3792	205 Main St. 32°28′14″N 98°40′52″W	Ranger	1962	Medallion is inside Greer's Western Store
Stubblefield Building		5143	101 S. Lamar St. 32°24′6″N 98°49′10″W	Eastland	1962	Lamar and Main on the courthouse square
The Connellee House		1038	515 S. Lamar St. 32°23′50″N 98°49′11″W	Eastland	1972	
The Kean Home‡		2908	309 W. Sixth St. 32°23′18″N 98°58′58″W	Cisco	1985	

== Ector County ==
Registered Texas Historic Landmark	Image	Marker number	Physical address	Nearest city	Year designated	Description
Barrow Ranch House		311	8900 N. County Rd. West (FM 1882) 31°57′9″N 102°25′2″W	Odessa	1962	From Ector County Courthouse, take US 385 North about 7.6 mile, go West on FM 1882 & continue 1/10 mile to Dirt Road going North,(marker on private property on east wall of two houses).
Ector County Discovery Well		1381	I-20 south service road 2.5 mi. W of Penwell 31°43′15″N 102°37′34″W	Penwell	1967	US 80 about 2.5 mile West of Penwell on east access road
Site of Old Livery Stable and Wagon Yard		4853	205 N. Grant St. 31°50′46″N 102°22′7″W	Odessa	1967	205 N. Grant St., Odessa (near Odessa Police Dept.)
White-Pool House†#	More images	5786	112 E. Murphy St. 31°50′32″N 102°21′51″W	Odessa	1980	112 E Murphy, Odessa

== Edwards County ==
Registered Texas Historic Landmark	Image	Marker number	Physical address	Nearest city	Year designated	Description
Edwards County Courthouse†#	More images	1402	100 W. Main St. 30°0′57″N 100°12′28″W	Rocksprings	1973	Courthouse Square; Rocksprings
First Baptist Church of Barksdale	More images	14896	200 Church St. 29°43′31″N 100°2′13″W	Barksdale	2008	118 CR 380
Headquarters, American Angora Goat Breeders' Assn.		2418	200 blk W. Austin St. 30°0′59″N 100°12′32″W	Rocksprings	1965	on Austin Street one block west of courthouse square, Rocksprings
Hough-Haven		2578	300 blk N. Sweeten St. 30°1′5″N 100°12′32″W	Rocksprings	1966	corner of Austin and Sweeten Street; Rocksprings
Old Carson Store		3702	N. Austin St. at SW corner of E. Well St. 30°0′59″N 100°12′27″W	Rocksprings	1968	corner of Austin and Well Street; Rocksprings

== El Paso County ==
Registered Texas Historic Landmark	Image	Marker number	Physical address	Nearest city	Year designated	Description
Burges House‡		569	603 W. Yandell Dr. 31°45′46″N 106°29′44″W	El Paso	1993	
Casa Ortiz		745	10180 Socorro Rd. 31°39′17″N 106°18′12″W	Socorro	1973	Apodaca Road at FM 258
El Paso First Ward Chapel		1428	3625 Douglas Ave. 31°47′19″N 106°27′4″W	El Paso	1984	
El Paso High School†	More images	18420	1600 N. Virginia St. 31°46′21″N 106°29′23″W	El Paso	2016	
El Paso Union Depot†#	More images	1437	700 San Francisco St. 31°45′27″N 106°29′45″W	El Paso	1982	
Guardian Angel Church		2302	3021 Frutas Ave. 31°46′29″N 106°27′32″W	El Paso	1983	at corner of San Marcial and Frutas
Hotel Cortez†	More images	12881	310 N. Mesa St. 31°45′35″N 106°29′14″W	El Paso	2002	310 N. Mesa
La Hacienda		2995	1720 W. Paisano Dr. 31°45′46″N 106°30′34″W	El Paso	1962	
Los Portales‡	More images	3129	1587 Church St. 31°35′6″N 106°16′24″W	San Elizario	1962	South corner of central town plaza
Magoffin Homestead†‡§#	More images	3183	1110 Magoffin Ave. 31°45′45″N 106°28′36″W	El Paso	1962	
Martin Building†		3226	215 N. Stanton St. 31°45′35″N 106°29′11″W	El Paso	1981	
Mesa Water Boosting Station†		15822	5001 Fred Wilson Ave. 31°49′35″N 106°25′41″W	El Paso	2009	
Mission Nuestra Senora de la Purisima Concepcion Del Socorro†	More images	3407	328 S. Nevarez Rd. 31°39′30″N 106°18′9″W	Socorro	1963	one block north of Intersection of Nevarez and FM 258
Old B'Nai Zion Synagogue†‡#	More images	3688	906 N. El Paso St. 31°45′37″N 106°29′22″W	El Paso	1985	
Old County Jail‡	More images	3715	1551 Main St. 31°35′8″N 106°16′27″W	San Elizario	1962	One block southeast of Central Plaza; San Elizario
Old County Jail‡	More images	14760	1551 Main St. 31°35′8″N 106°16′27″W	San Elizario	1970	
Old Fort Bliss†		3730	1836 W. Paisano Dr. 31°45′47″N 106°30′33″W	El Paso	1965	
Old Main		3761	551 Circle Dr. 31°46′19″N 106°30′20″W	El Paso	1982	Circle Road, University of Texas at El Paso Campus, El Paso
San Elizario Chapel†‡	More images	4533	1556 San Elizario Rd. 31°35′5″N 106°16′22″W	San Elizario	1962	at southwest corner of the property
Simeon Hart Residence, Site of Hart's Mill (El Molino)		4699	1720 W. Paisano Dr. 31°45′46″N 106°30′34″W	El Paso	1981	
Singer Building†		4711	211 Texas Ave. 31°45′33″N 106°29′12″W	El Paso	1983	
Site of Tienda de Carbajal		4904	10245 Socorro Rd. 31°38′37″N 106°18′20″W	Socorro	1972	corner of below road and FM 258; Socorro
The Woman's Club of El Paso†	More images	5453	1400 N. Mesa St. 31°46′2″N 106°29′40″W	El Paso	1980	
Turner Home‡		5572	1301 Montana Ave. 31°46′15″N 106°28′52″W	El Paso	1982	
Wallace Apartments‡		5707	1205 Randolph Dr. 31°45′49″N 106°29′53″W	El Paso	1985	Yandell and Randolph Streets (east wall facing Randolph)
Ysleta Mission†	More images	15485	131 S. Zaragoza Rd. 31°41′27″N 106°19′38″W	El Paso	1962	

== Ellis County ==
Registered Texas Historic Landmark	Image	Marker number	Physical address	Nearest city	Year designated	Description
1889 Masonic Lodge Hall‡	More images	7120	201 S. College St. 32°23′5″N 96°50′51″W	Waxahachie	1976	201 S. College St., Waxahachie
Dunlap - Simpson House‡		7073	1203 W. Main St. 32°23′44″N 96°51′39″W	Waxahachie	1974	1203 W. Main St., Waxahachie
Eddy O. Hawkins Home‡		7112	200 S. Hawkins St. 32°23′18″N 96°51′16″W	Waxahachie	1984	200 S. Hawkins St., Waxahachie
Ellis County Courthouse‡#	More images	7091	101 W. Main St. 32°23′8″N 96°50′42″W	Waxahachie	1969	Courthouse Square on Main St., Waxahachie
Ellis County Woman's Building (Davis Hall)‡		13611	407 W. Jefferson St. 32°23′7″N 96°51′4″W	Waxahachie	2006	407 W Jefferson St
Ennis City Hall‡		7097	119 W. Brown St. 32°19′35″N 96°37′38″W	Ennis	1985	109 W. Brown, Ennis
Ennis National Bank‡		7098	110 W. Ennis Ave. 32°19′40″N 96°37′40″W	Ennis	1983	110 W. Ennis Ave., Ennis
First Presbyterian Church Building‡		11858	501 W. Main St. 32°23′14″N 96°51′5″W	Waxahachie	1997	
First Presbyterian Church of Ferris		7104	201 N. Church St. 32°32′9″N 96°40′2″W	Ferris	1994	201 N. Church St., Ferris
Fry - Butcher House		7064	501 FM 2377 32°30′16″N 96°47′17″W	Red Oak	1992	
George Rossan Home		7066	S of Mike Rd. near Mill Creek 32°6′48″N 96°55′13″W	Milford	1962	1.5 mi. E of Milford. Take Water St. E to "y" in road, Just off the left branch.
H.P. and Mollie McCartney House		18825	504 Sycamore St. 32°24′1″N 96°50′44″W	Waxahachie	2017	
Hancock Building‡		7108	203 S. College St. 32°23′5″N 96°50′51″W	Waxahachie	1984	203 S. College St., Waxahachie
Harkey - Payne House		7110	216 W. Jefferson St. 32°25′50″N 96°40′20″W	Palmer	1983	216 W. Jefferson St., Palmer
Hawkins House‡	More images	7111	210 S. Hawkins St. 32°23′17″N 96°51′18″W	Waxahachie	1990	210 S. Hawkins St., Waxahachie
Jefferson Dunaway Home		7065	115 Dunaway Rd. 32°18′23″N 96°54′49″W	Waxahachie	1970	
Joshua Chapel A.M.E. Church†	More images	7070	110 Aiken St. 32°22′59″N 96°50′23″W	Waxahachie	1984	
McKinney-Aday Farm House		17480	130 Cunningham Meadows Rd. 32°21′26″N 96°53′53″W	Waxahachie	2013	Approximately 5 feet north of the brick walkway leading to the house, centered on the midpoint of the length of the walkway
Moore House†		12717	400 W. Denton St. 32°19′50″N 96°38′0″W	Ennis	2002	400 W. Denton
Old Ellis County Jail‡		7094	200 N. Rogers St. 32°23′12″N 96°50′51″W	Waxahachie	1978	At the corner of Rogers and Water St., Waxahachie
Presiding Elder's House‡		7140	201 Oldham Ave. 32°23′20″N 96°50′39″W	Waxahachie	1988	201 Oldham Ave., Waxahachie
Rockett Christian Church		7143	135 Maple Leaf Dr. 32°28′11″N 96°45′48″W	Rockett	1983	Intersection of FM 183 and Loma Linda Rd., Rockett
Rogers Street Bridge‡	More images	7069	Rogers St. over Waxahachie Creek 32°22′55″N 96°51′2″W	Waxahachie	1981	Rogers Street Bridge over Waxahachie Creek on Hwy. 77
Rosemont†		7068	701 S. Rogers St. 32°22′44″N 96°51′14″W	Waxahachie	1981	701 S. Rogers Street
Rutherford's Crossing Bridge		7144	Over Red Oak Creek W of new Rutherford Rd. bridge 32°26′54″N 96°44′28″W	Waxahachie	1990	On Rutherford Rd., 3 mi. off FM 878 and 8 mi. S. of Waxahachie
Saint James A.M.E. Church		7145	312 Bois D Arc St. 32°7′9″N 96°56′44″W	Milford	1992	FM 308 and Bois D'arc St., Milford
Shiloh Cumberland Presbyterian Church		7148	7810 Shiloh Rd. 32°31′2″N 96°53′45″W	Ovilla	1962	intersection of Shiloh Rd. and FM 664, Ovilla
St. Paul's Episcopal†	More images	7062	308 N. Monroe St. 32°23′21″N 96°50′52″W	Waxahachie	1965	Corner of McMillian & Monroe Sts.
Strickland-Sawyer House†‡		7152	500 Oldham Ave. 32°23′15″N 96°50′31″W	Waxahachie	1980	500 Oldham Ave., Waxahachie
The H.P. Barkley Home†		7082	709 N. Dallas St. 32°19′57″N 96°37′55″W	Ennis	1981	709 N. Dallas, Ennis
The Mahoney-Thompson House‡		7118	604 W. Main St. 32°23′20″N 96°51′9″W	Waxahachie	1969	604 W. Main St., Waxahachie
The Telico Church		7156	S end of Telico Cemetery Rd. 32°22′1″N 96°30′34″W	Ennis	1988	From Ennis go E on SH 34 about 6 mi. then S on FM 1181 to Telico Cemetery Rd.
Trippet-Shive House†		7078	209 N. Grand Ave. 32°23′55″N 96°51′44″W	Waxahachie	1983	209 N. Grand Ave., Waxahachie
Trotter House		18604	508 S. Ninth St. 32°28′39″N 96°59′35″W	Midlothian	2017	
Waxahachie Chautauqua Building†#	More images	7077	400 S. Grand Ave. 32°23′46″N 96°51′58″W	Waxahachie	1972	In Getzendaner Park off Gran Ave. S., Waxahachie
William L. and Emma Hawkins House		7113	803 W. Ave. G 32°28′57″N 97°0′5″W	Midlothian	1994	Corner of 2nd St. and Ave. G., Midlothian
Williams-Erwin House†	More images	7063	412 W. Marvin Ave. 32°23′40″N 96°50′52″W	Waxahachie	1978	

== Erath County ==
Registered Texas Historic Landmark	Image	Marker number	Physical address	Nearest city	Year designated	Description
Bluff Dale Tabernacle		442	425 Glenn St. 32°20′52″N 98°1′15″W	Bluff Dale	1982	Corner of Glenn and Dennis streets
Cage Home		620	194 E. Long St. 32°13′8″N 98°12′0″W	Stephenville	1983	
Clairette Schoolhouse	More images	901	3 mi. N of US 281 on SH 6 32°2′27″N 98°7′10″W	Clairette	1985	From Hico, take SH 6 north about 7 miles; 3 mi. N of intersection with Hwy 281
Crow Home		16446	396 E. Long St. 32°13′11″N 98°11′55″W	Stephenville	2010	Intersection of Long and Vine Street, 3 blocks south of Washington
Crow Opera House	More images	1122	187 W. Washington St. 32°13′14″N 98°12′10″W	Stephenville	1977	
D. L. Harris House		1144	718 N. Patrick St. 32°5′44″N 98°20′22″W	Dublin	1982	
Dawson Saloon		18519	190 W. College St. 32°13′10″N 98°12′8″W	Stephenville	2016	
Doublin Inn		1260	701 Cottonwood St. 32°4′32″N 98°20′25″W	Dublin	1971	SW end of Cottonwood St., old part (dirt road), facing railroad tracks, Dublin; MARKER IS NOT AT STRUCTURE 5/2011
Duffau School		11868	0.5 mi. S of FM 1824 on FM 2481 32°4′27″N 98°11′17″W	Stephenville	1998	15 mi. S of Stephenville on US 281; 4 mi. E on FM 1824 to Duffau Store; .5 mi. S on FM 2481; at intersection of FM 2481 and FM 1824
Erath Arches	More images	15792	500 W. Washington St. 32°13′8″N 98°12′21″W	Stephenville	2009	
Erath County Courthouse†#	More images	1494	100 W. Washington St. 32°13′12″N 98°12′7″W	Stephenville	1963	Corner of Washington and Graham
First Methodist Church of Stephenville		1771	328 W. Washington St. 32°13′10″N 98°12′14″W	Stephenville	1988	
First National Bank Building†	More images	1785	198 S. Belknap Ave. 32°13′11″N 98°12′10″W	Stephenville	1994	
Gentry and Shelton Building		18517	104 E. College St. 32°13′12″N 98°12′5″W	Stephenville	2016	
Holt House		16419	459 Church St. 32°21′3″N 98°1′32″W	Bluff Dale	2010	459 Church St.
J. F. Warnock Hardware		2675	147 N. Greenwood St. 32°21′5″N 98°1′16″W	Bluff Dale	1984	North Greenwood Street, Bluff Dale
Lingleville Tabernacle		6255	FM 219, about 0.2 mi. S of FM 8 32°14′32″N 98°22′41″W	Lingleville	1983	FM 219, about 0.2 miles south of FM 8, Lingleville
Oldest Home in Stephenville†	More images	3841	525 E. Washington St. 32°13′19″N 98°11′57″W	Stephenville	1967	
Oxford House	More images	3894	619 E. Washington St. 32°13′23″N 98°11′53″W	Stephenville	1994	
Pecan Cemetery Tabernacle		3969	Pecan Cemetery Rd. off CR 291 31°59′8″N 98°15′11″W	Dublin vicinity	1996	8 miles southeast of Dublin on FM 219; then 1.5 miles south on CR 291 (Pecan Cemetery Road)
President's House#		4115	1500 Military Dr. 32°12′58″N 98°12′59″W	Stephenville	1988	Tarleton State University campus, Hall of Presidents, corner of Doc Blanchard Blvd. and Military Drive
Stephenville Church of 1900	More images	5112	525 E. Washington St. 32°13′23″N 98°11′56″W	Stephenville	1977	at Stephenville Historical Museum
The Gallagher House		2099	261 N. Grafton St. 32°5′14″N 98°20′24″W	Dublin	1980	
William T. Miller Grist Mill	More images	5847	120 S. Park St. 32°5′5″N 98°20′39″W	Dublin	1975	At Wm. Wright Historical Park
Wyatt-Boyd Ranch Complex†		6399	Off US 281 northwest of FM 913 32°8′39″N 98°9′8″W	Stephenville vicinity	1987	from Stephenville, take US 281 south about 5.5 miles

== Falls County ==
Registered Texas Historic Landmark	Image	Marker number	Physical address	Nearest city	Year designated	Description
Allen House		126	305 Ward St. 31°18′32″N 96°53′55″W	Marlin	1991	305 Ward St., Marlin
Blue Ridge Baptist Church		440	S 3.5 mi. on FM 1771 from SH 7 31°16′12″N 96°44′24″W	Reagan	1970	From Marlin take SH 7 about 9.5 mi., then go south on FM 1771 about 3.5 mi.
Boyhood Home of Tom Connally		1037	1.5 mi NW on CR 437 from SH 7 31°17′38″N 97°14′9″W	Bruceville-Eddy	1962	From Burceville-Eddy, take Sh 7 SE 1 mi then go NW CW co. Rd about 1.5 mi.
Dodson Place		1240	7 mi. NW on FM 935	Lott	1962	From Lott, follow FM 935 NW about 7 mi., private
Falconer Home		1560	433 Agnes Ave. 31°18′52″N 96°53′27″W	Marlin	1983	433 Agnes Ave., Marlin
Falls County Courthouse†#	More images	11717	125 Bridge St. 31°18′25″N 96°53′55″W	Marlin	2000	
Frank and Julia Bockholt Home‡		13048	W side CR 379 between SH 320 and CR 380 31°6′50″N 97°7′19″W	Westphalia	2003	CR 379 at SH 320
Henslee House		2454	507 N. Second St. 31°4′41″N 96°58′43″W	Rosebud	1985	507 N. Second St., Rosebud
Highlands Mansion		2478	N side FM 147 E of SH 6 31°19′22″N 96°52′54″W	Marlin	1967	From Marlin take Fm 147 NE about 1 mi (Just past jct. with Sh 6)
James Bayliss Buck Farmstead		18234	1641 US 77 31°7′48″N 96°59′59″W	Rosebud	2015	Highway 77, 0.25 miles south of Travis, Falls County, Texas
Mooreville Methodist Church		3464	206 FM 2643 31°18′7″N 97°8′30″W	Mooreville	1991	FM 2643, Mooreville. Destroyed by fire February 7, 2019
Perry United Methodist Church		3991	193 CR 127 31°26′5″N 96°53′28″W	Perry	1972	From Perry, take FM 1240 east about 2 mi.

== Fannin County ==
Registered Texas Historic Landmark	Image	Marker number	Physical address	Nearest city	Year designated	Description
Biard Home		8842	905 N. Main St. 33°34′55″N 96°10′46″W	Bonham	1964	
Blanton Chapel Methodist Church		8845	1025 FM 981 33°23′50″N 96°17′37″W	Trenton	1964	from Leonard take SH 78 west 3 miles to FM 981; then north on FM 981 1.5 miles
Bonham High School Auditorium and Gymnasium		12459	1201 N. Main St. 33°35′5″N 96°10′47″W	Bonham	2001	N. Main at 12th St.; physical address listed is for entire campus
Church of St. Mark, The Evangelist, Episcopal		8857	401 S. Eighth St. 33°34′56″N 95°54′29″W	Honey Grove	1984	8th & Market
Dial United Presbyterian Church		8865	8491 FM 824 33°29′51″N 95°52′13″W	Dial	1969	across from Dial Cemetery on FM 824
First National Bank		8880	120 W. Sam Rayburn Dr. 33°34′39″N 96°10′48″W	Bonham	1966	SH 56
First Presbyterian Church	More images	8883	818 N. Main St. 33°34′54″N 96°10′44″W	Bonham	1965	
First United Methodist Church of Leonard		8885	206 N. Main St. 33°22′57″N 96°14′50″W	Leonard	1981	Main & Houston St.
Fry Homestead		8889	395 FM 2456 33°24′55″N 95°57′10″W	Ladonia	1964	
Galbraith House		8890	506 CR 3425 33°34′19″N 95°57′21″W	Honey Grove	1973	
Haden House†		8896	603 W. Bonham St. 33°25′30″N 95°57′10″W	Ladonia	1966	Richard & Bonham Sts.
Home of T. H. Sears		8932	6694 FM 151 33°30′49″N 96°22′37″W	Whitewright	1967	from Whitewright, FM 151 S one mi. to site
Ladonia Presbyterian Church Building	More images	11876	201 Paris St. 33°25′35″N 95°56′45″W	Ladonia	1997	Church and Paris
McClellan-Cunningham House		16897	304 W. Seventh St. 33°34′49″N 96°10′54″W	Bonham	2011	
McKenzie Methodist Church		8912	701 N. Seventh St. 33°35′6″N 95°54′31″W	Honey Grove	1994	7th & Pecan St.
Morrell Boarding House		8915	205 N. Jackson St. 33°25′37″N 95°56′29″W	Ladonia	1965	on Jackson St. north of Jackson and E. Paris St. intersection
Old Baldwin Home		8837	708 Main St. 33°33′53″N 96°0′5″W	Windom	1967	
Old Home of Pioneer Banker A. B. Scarborough		8931	219 W. Sam Rayburn Dr. 33°34′36″N 96°10′53″W	Bonham	1966	corner of Star and Sam Rayburn
Old Kirkpatrick Home		8905	1008 FM 151 33°30′46″N 96°22′49″W	Whitewright	1967	from Whitewright take FM 151 east .5 miles
Old W. W. Brownlee Home		8850	220 W. Sixth St. 33°34′46″N 96°10′52″W	Bonham	1967	
Rehobeth Cemetery Chapel		8925	1666 CR 3900 33°23′48″N 96°1′24″W	Ladonia	1964	from Ladonia take FM 34 west 4.7 miles to Rehobeth Cemetery Rd.; then south 1.3 miles
Sam Rayburn House⁕†§#	More images	8923	890 W. SH 56 33°34′10″N 96°12′22″W	Bonham	1965	from Bonham take US 82 west 1.5 miles
Sam Rayburn Library and Museum†	More images	15226	800 W. Sam Rayburn Dr. 33°34′42″N 96°11′16″W	Bonham	2008	
Texas and Pacific Depot†	More images	8939	1 N. Main St. 33°34′25″N 96°10′45″W	Bonham	1990	
Virginia Point Methodist Church		8944	1386 CR 1200 33°39′22″N 96°22′32″W	Savoy	1965	from FM 1752 & US 82 intersection in Savoy take FM 1752 north 4.3miles to gravel road; then west on gravel road 1.4 miles
Wheeler House		8946	3 mi. W on SH 56 33°34′34″N 95°57′36″W	Honey Grove	1965	from Honey Grove take SH 56 west 3 miles

== Fayette County ==
Registered Texas Historic Landmark	Image	Marker number	Physical address	Nearest city	Year designated	Description
Beer Office and Bottling Company‡	More images	353	114 S. Main St. 29°54′15″N 96°52′44″W	La Grange	1983	114 S Main St., La Grange.
Bethlehem Lutheran Church†	More images	396	412 S. White St. 30°3′46″N 96°41′58″W	Round Top	1965	south end of White Street., Round Top.
Bradshaw-Killough House		486	345 E. Travis St. 29°54′27″N 96°52′27″W	La Grange	1991	345 E Travis St., La Grange.
Brethren Church		500	1022 Kramr Rd. 29°53′0″N 96°40′16″W	Fayetteville	1964	From Fayetteville, take Ross Prairie Road south about 1.4 mile to Junction of Ross Prairie & Kramer Rds.
Casino Hall‡		18722	254 N. Jefferson St. 29°54′28″N 96°52′37″W	La Grange	2017	
City Library Building		876	159 E. Fannin St. 29°54′32″N 96°52′40″W	La Grange	1970	159 E. Fannin St., La Grange
Compton-Zapp House‡		1016	111 W. Market St. 29°54′19″N 96°40′39″W	Fayetteville	1985	Market & Washington St., Fayetteville.
Earthman Farm		1365	10 mi. N near FM 2145	La Grange	1972	N/A - missing
Fayette County Courthouse†‡#	More images	12627	151 N. Washington St. 29°54′19″N 96°52′43″W	La Grange	2001	west lawn of courthouse square
Fayette County Precinct No. 2 Courthouse‡		1580	112 N. Washington St. 29°54′16″N 96°40′33″W	Fayetteville	1977	Town square
Flatonia City Hospital and Opera House‡		1908	109 W. South Main St. 29°41′11″N 97°6′32″W	Flatonia	1983	Marker reported missing June 2016.
Flatonia Methodist Church	More images	1909	403 E. North Main St. 29°41′17″N 97°6′15″W	Flatonia	1971	N.E. Main St. & N. Middle St., Flatonia.
Freyburg Methodist Church		14197	4520 FM 2238 29°44′10″N 96°59′58″W	Flatonia	1994	From Flatonia, take I-10 about 6 miles E., then go N. about 2 miles cn FM 2238, in Freyburg.
Gus Cranz Mansion		1106	701 West Ave. 29°40′50″N 96°54′41″W	Schulenburg	1964	710 W. Ave., Schulenburg.
Hamilton Ledbetter House		3061	229 Hackemack Rd. 30°2′53″N 96°40′21″W	Round Top	1978	From Round Top, travel southeast on E. Mills St. (which becomes Kneip Rd.) 1.9 mi. then north 0.1 mi. on Hackemack Rd. House is on E. side of road.
Hermes House		13237	541 N. Main St. 29°54′31″N 96°52′55″W	La Grange	2004	541 N. Main St.
John Vogt Homestead		5659	5 mi. E on FM 609	La Grange	1983	from La Grange, take FM 609 west about 5 mile.
Kallus House		15434	451 N. Franklin St. 29°54′34″N 96°52′42″W	La Grange	2004	451 N. Franklin
Kaulbach Home		2907	351 E. Colorado St. 29°54′30″N 96°52′28″W	La Grange	1968	351 E. Colorado St., La Grange.
Konrad Joh Log Cabin		2763	2260 Hartfield Rd. 30°3′2″N 96°43′15″W	Round Top	1978	From Round Top, take Hwy. 237 South 1 mile then go West on Hartfield Road 1 mile - house is on west side of street.
Lenert House		3070	350 N. Madison St. 29°54′34″N 96°52′34″W	La Grange	1987	350 N. Madison, La Grange.
Ludwig and Caroline Giese House		12823	1103 S. Nassau Rd. 30°1′8″N 96°38′48″W	Round Top	2002	1103 S. Nassau
Lyons Lodge No. 195, A. F.& A. M.		3155	114 College St. 29°41′4″N 96°54′0″W	Schulenburg	1965	
Meerscheidt House		3319	458 N. Monroe St. 29°54′39″N 96°52′32″W	La Grange	1994	458 N. Monroe St., La Grange.
Mulberry Creek Bridge†#	More images	3526	Near West Ave. and Kallus St., Wolters Park 29°40′27″N 96°54′39″W	Schulenburg	1990	From Schulenburg, go South on FM 957 about 2 miles, then go west on Ha..es Rd. 1 mile
Olle Hotel‡		15738	218 S. Market St. 29°41′9″N 97°6′26″W	Flatonia	2009	218 S. Market Ave.
Rocky Creek Farm		4330	1475 Kneip Rd. 30°3′20″N 96°40′49″W	Round Top	1970	from Round Top, take County Road 102 SE about 1.6 miles (on E. side of rd.)
S.P.J.S.T. Lodge No. 1‡		17681	507 E. Main St. 29°54′30″N 96°40′18″W	Fayetteville	2013	507 East Main Street
Schueddemagen Home		4605	SE corner S. Washington St. at E. Wantke St. 30°3′50″N 96°41′50″W	Round Top	1964	Rock St. and Hwy. 237, Round Top.
Schulenburg Baptist Church		4608	110 N. Upton Ave. 29°41′21″N 96°54′19″W	Schulenburg	1972	Corner of N. Upton & Nelba Ave., Schulenburg.
Spacek House‡		4995	103 N. Washington St. 29°54′13″N 96°40′34″W	Fayetteville	1983	Town Square, one house north of corner of Main & Washington St., Fayetteville.
St. James Episcopal Church†		4443	156 N. Monroe St. 29°54′29″N 96°52′25″W	La Grange	1964	Monroe & Colorado St., La Grange.
The Faison House†		1558	822 S. Jefferson St. 29°53′57″N 96°52′22″W	La Grange	1962	822 S. Jefferson St., La Grange.
The Menn House		3337	FM 1457 at north edge of town 30°4′41″N 96°41′4″W	Round Top	1973	N. city limits, FM 1457, Round Top.
The Old Masonic Building‡		3248	138 W. Travis St. 29°54′20″N 96°52′39″W	La Grange	1962	E. Travis St.
The Sladek-Hillman House‡		4946	209 N. Rusk St. 29°54′14″N 96°40′42″W	Fayetteville	1979	SH 159 and FM 955, Fayetteville.
Townsend-Bremer House		5541	1 mi. S on FM 237 30°0′8″N 96°44′45″W	Warrenton	1990	From Warrenton, take FM 237 South about 1 mile.
Wheeler Building‡	More images	5778	101 W. South Main St. 29°41′11″N 97°6′31″W	Flatonia	1989	101 West South Main, Fatonia.
Winedale Stagecoach Inn†#		5863	3738 FM 2714 30°5′15″N 96°38′28″W	Round Top	1967	from Round Top, take FM 1457 W about 2.5 miles then go NW on FM 2714 1/2 miles.
Zapp Building†‡	More images	5940	201 W. Fayette St. 29°54′15″N 96°40′37″W	Fayetteville	1983	Corner of Fayette & Washington, Fayetteville.

== Fisher County ==
There are currently no Recorded Texas Historic Landmarks listed within the county.

== Floyd County ==
Registered Texas Historic Landmark	Image	Marker number	Physical address	Nearest city	Year designated	Description
Carr's Chapel		735	FM 378 N of CR 288 33°55′33″N 101°30′48″W	Floydada	1962	from Floydada, take FM 784 West about 8 miles, then follow FM 378 south about 6.5 miles.
Zimmerman House		5953	516 S. First St. 33°58′49″N 101°20′36″W	Floydada	1990	516 South First Street, Floydada

== Foard County ==
Registered Texas Historic Landmark	Image	Marker number	Physical address	Nearest city	Year designated	Description
Foard County Courthouse	More images	12719	100 S. Main St. 33°59′1″N 99°43′28″W	Crowell	2001	100 Main at Commerce St. (SH 6 at US 70)

== Fort Bend County ==
Registered Texas Historic Landmark	Image	Marker number	Physical address	Nearest city	Year designated	Description
Cartwright-McCrary House		8984	6 mi. W of Clodine off FM 1093 near Fulshear	Clodine	1979	
Fort Bend County Courthouse†#	More images	8994	401 Jackson St. 29°34′54″N 95°45′42″W	Richmond	1980	between 4th & 5th Sts.
Fort Bend County Jail		8995	602 Preston St. 29°35′2″N 95°45′52″W	Richmond	1985	
Home of Thomas Barnett		8968	5 mi. NW off SH 36 near Dyer Switch	Rosenberg	1962	5 mi. northwest off State 36
McNabb House		9009	SE corner N. Sixth St. at Preston St. 29°35′1″N 95°45′50″W	Richmond	1979	Decker Park, 6th at Preston
Moore Home†	More images	9011	406 S. Fifth St. 29°34′51″N 95°45′44″W	Richmond	1962	corner of 5th and Houston St.
Morton-McCloy House		9051	402 N. Second St. 29°35′12″N 95°45′41″W	Richmond	1994	
Simonton School		16950	34935 FM 1093 29°40′46″N 95°58′21″W	Simonton	2011	the north front of the school faces the railroad tract at Hwy 1093
St. John's United Methodist Church†		9064	400 Jackson St. 29°34′56″N 95°45′42″W	Richmond	1983	corner of Jackson & 4th
Sugar Land Auditorium		9070	226 Lakeview Dr. 29°37′27″N 95°37′50″W	Sugar Land	1992	
Teague-Waddell House		9073	1810 Ave. M 29°33′9″N 95°48′29″W	Rosenberg	1979	
Texas Prison System Central State Farm Main Building		12990	1 Circle Dr. 29°36′53″N 95°39′44″W	Sugar Land	2002	Sugar Land, 1 Circle Drive
The Darst-Yoder House		8986	300 S. Ninth St. 29°34′49″N 95°45′57″W	Richmond	1976	corner of 9th and Jackson St.
The John H. Pickens Davis House		8987	10215 FM 762 29°29′51″N 95°40′57″W	Richmond	1962	on FM 762 east of Richmond in George Ranch Historical Park
The McFarlane House	More images	9007	410 Jackson St. 29°34′56″N 95°45′44″W	Richmond	1985	corner of 5th and Jackson
The Peareson-Winston House		9055	404 S. Ninth St. 29°34′46″N 95°45′55″W	Richmond	1976	
Vogelsang Building		9076	1911 Ave. G 29°33′34″N 95°48′27″W	Rosenberg	1986	

== Franklin County ==
Registered Texas Historic Landmark	Image	Marker number	Physical address	Nearest city	Year designated	Description
J. A. Drummond Farm Home†		9838	45 CR SE 4135 33°7′6″N 95°9′11″W	Mount Vernon	1963	MARKER REPORTED MISSING 3/2011
Killingsworth Home		9847	4932 SE Access Rd. 33°9′37″N 95°8′55″W	Mount Vernon	1965	
The Wright-Vaughan House		9852	311 E. Main St. 33°11′20″N 95°13′8″W	Mount Vernon	1974	

== Freestone County ==
Registered Texas Historic Landmark	Image	Marker number	Physical address	Nearest city	Year designated	Description
1919 Freestone County Courthouse		23879	118 E. Commerce St. 31°43′33″N 96°9′36″W	Fairfield	2023	
Bradley House		9861	318 Moody St. 31°43′56″N 96°9′49″W	Fairfield	1967	
Carter Log House		9867	302 E. Main St. 31°43′36″N 96°9′28″W	Fairfield	1968	Freestone Co. Historical Museum - Main St. and Hall St.
Harmony Church		9882	FM 2547 S of FM 833 31°49′18″N 96°12′13″W	Fairfield	1965	about 8 mi. north of Fairfield on FM 2547, just before the intersection of FM 2547 and FM 833
John F. Wallace House		9910	101 S. Ninth Ave. 31°37′35″N 96°16′40″W	Teague	1987	corner of 9th and Main
Old Freestone Jail	More images	9879	302 E. Main St. 31°43′35″N 96°9′29″W	Fairfield	1967	
Old Judge Allegre House		9853	109 N. First St. 31°47′19″N 96°27′43″W	Wortham	1969	corner of N. 1st and Concho St.
Potter-Watson Log Cabin		9899	302 E. Main St. 31°43′36″N 96°9′29″W	Fairfield	1969	Main and Hall St.
Stewards Mill Store, 1869		9905	FM 2547 at FM 833 31°49′21″N 96°12′16″W	Fairfield	1964	about 8 mi. north of Fairfield at the intersection of FM 2547 and FM 833. Marker reported missing Feb. 2010.
The Dr. Emmet Headlee House		9884	420 S. Tenth Ave. 31°37′22″N 96°16′39″W	Teague	1965	corner of 10th & Pine
The Fridolin (Fred) Fischer Home		9877	222 S. Hall St. 31°43′27″N 96°9′28″W	Fairfield	1982	
The Manahan House		9892	127 E. Reunion St. 31°43′22″N 96°9′34″W	Fairfield	1972	

== Frio County ==
Registered Texas Historic Landmark	Image	Marker number	Physical address	Nearest city	Year designated	Description
Old Frio County Jail†#	More images	3733	500 S. Pecan St. 28°53′16″N 99°5′35″W	Pearsall	1970	adjacent to courthouse square, Highway 81, Pearsall
Pearsall Presbyterian Church		3965	308 S. Pecan St. 28°53′20″N 99°5′34″W	Pearsall	1971	Pecan Street and Comal Street, Pearsall

== Gaines County ==
Registered Texas Historic Landmark	Image	Marker number	Physical address	Nearest city	Year designated	Description
Dan Cobb Home		1162	501 NW Third St. 32°43′28″N 102°38′54″W	Seminole	1963	501 Northwest Third Street, Seminole
Simpson Hotel		4706	302 Main Ave. 32°56′33″N 102°33′48″W	Seagraves	1991	302 Main Street, Seagraves

== Galveston County ==
Registered Texas Historic Landmark	Image	Marker number	Physical address	Nearest city	Year designated	Description
1871 Thomas Jefferson League Building⁂‡		7513	2301-2307 Strand (Ave. B) 29°18′25″N 94°47′40″W	Galveston	1979	
A. Wilkins Miller Cottage		7531	1707 Winnie St. (Ave. G) 29°18′16″N 94°47′11″W	Galveston	1983	
Adriance-Springer House⁂‡		9917	1703 Broadway St. (Ave. J) 29°18′5″N 94°47′7″W	Galveston	1989	
Albertson Home		17947	2017 Ave. N1/2 29°17′43″N 94°47′14″W	Galveston	2014	
Ashton Villa, 1859†	More images	9924	2328 Broadway St. (Ave. J) 29°17′59″N 94°47′33″W	Galveston	1967	
Baden-Sproule House		58	1919 37th St. 29°17′14″N 94°48′20″W	Galveston	1989	
Best-Lucas House⁂‡		13815	1122 Sealy St. (Ave. I) 29°18′17″N 94°46′46″W	Galveston	2005	1122 Sealy
Boddeker House⁂‡		12810	1114 Broadway St. (Ave. J) 29°18′14″N 94°46′44″W	Galveston	2001	1114 Broadway
C. F. Marschner Building†		7527	1916 Mechanic St. (Ave. C) 29°18′27″N 94°47′25″W	Galveston	1997	
Campbell Home⁂‡		14221	1515 Broadway St. (Ave. J) 29°18′7″N 94°47′0″W	Galveston	1962	
Carl and Hilda Biehl House⁂‡	More images	17278	1416 Broadway St. (Ave. J) 29°18′11″N 94°46′57″W	Galveston	2012	Southeast corner of the lot facing Broadway.
Cecil and Frances Brown House		259	312 S. Friendswood Dr. 29°31′47″N 95°12′7″W	Friendswood	1997	
Clarke-Jockusch Home⁂‡		8234	1728 Sealy St. (Ave. I) 29°18′10″N 94°47′11″W	Galveston	1965	1728 Sealy, Galveston
Congregation B'nai Israel Synagogue	More images	8237	822 Kempner Ave. (22nd St.) 29°18′6″N 94°47′27″W	Galveston	1967	822 22nd Street, Galveston
Davidson-Penland House⁂‡		16848	1207 Postoffice St. (Ave. E) 29°18′27″N 94°46′52″W	Galveston	2011	
Davison Home†#		15582	109 Third Ave. N 29°23′13″N 94°53′42″W	Texas City	1967	
Dr. Frederick K. and Lucy Adelaide Fisher House		7450	3503 Bernardo de Gálvez St. (Ave. P) 29°17′18″N 94°48′12″W	Galveston	1993	
E. S. Levy and Company		7516	2227 Postoffice St. (Ave. E) 29°18′16″N 94°47′36″W	Galveston	1966	
Eaton Memorial Chapel†	More images	7435	710 Kempner Ave. (22nd St.) 29°18′9″N 94°47′31″W	Galveston	1970	
First Hutchings-Sealy National Bank⁂‡	More images	7441	2326-2328 Strand (Ave. B) 29°18′26″N 94°47′43″W	Galveston	1962	
First Lutheran Church†	More images	7442	2415 Winnie St. (Ave. G) 29°18′8″N 94°47′40″W	Galveston	1969	Marker reported missing Jun 2007.
First Presbyterian Church†	More images	7444	1903 Church St. (Ave. F) 29°18′17″N 94°47′20″W	Galveston	1968	
Franklin-Wandless House‡		11889	1920 Ave. M 29°17′55″N 94°47′14″W	Galveston	1999	
Frederich-Erhard House⁂‡		7454	1320 Ball St. (Ave. H) 29°18′18″N 94°46′55″W	Galveston	1990	
Frederick William Beissner House⁂‡	More images	64	1702 Ball St. (Ave. H) 29°18′14″N 94°47′10″W	Galveston	1990	
Galveston Children's Home†	More images	7458	1315 Moody Ave. (21st St.) 29°17′50″N 94°47′19″W	Galveston	1978	
Galveston Garten Verein†#		7468	2702 Ave. O 29°17′34″N 94°47′41″W	Galveston	1971	Kempee Park, 27th and Ave. O
Galveston Orphans Home†	More images	18286	1315 Moody Ave. (21st St.) 29°17′50″N 94°47′19″W	Galveston	2015	1315 21st Street (West side of the street)
George Fox House⁂‡		7453	1402 Ball St. (Ave. H) 29°18′17″N 94°46′57″W	Galveston	1981	
George Seeligson Home⁂‡		7181	1208 Ball St. (Ave. H) 29°18′19″N 94°46′50″W	Galveston	1976	
Grace Episcopal Church†	More images	7477	1115 36th St. 29°17′39″N 94°48′23″W	Galveston	1967	36th and Avenue L
Grand Opera House 1894†	More images	7478	2020 Postoffice St. (Ave. E) 29°17′47″N 94°47′26″W	Galveston	1990	
Grover-Chambers House⁂‡	More images	7479	1520 Market St. (Ave. D) 29°18′28″N 94°47′8″W	Galveston	1976	
Hagemann-Cobb House†		7482	3301 Ave. L 29°17′40″N 94°48′47″W	Galveston	1982	
Hawes Summer Home		16835	2512 Ave. P1/2 29°17′27″N 94°47′31″W	Galveston	2011	
Heidenheimer-Hunter Building⁂‡		7485	2127 Mechanic St. (Ave. C) 29°18′23″N 94°47′34″W	Galveston	1987	22nd and Mechanic St.
Hendley's Row⁂‡	More images	7487	2000-2016 Strand (Ave. B) 29°18′30″N 94°47′29″W	Galveston	1981	
Henry C. Henck Jr. House		7488	2008 Ave. N1/2 29°17′45″N 94°47′14″W	Galveston	1991	
Henry Rosenberg Home	More images	7165	1306 Market St. (Ave. D) 29°18′31″N 94°46′58″W	Galveston	1962	
Hotel Galvez†	More images	7494	2024 Seawall Blvd. 29°17′32″N 94°47′8″W	Galveston	1980	2100 block Seawall Blvd.
Hutchings House		7495	2816 Ave. O 29°17′34″N 94°47′47″W	Galveston	1962	Marker on south side of the house, facing Avenue O. Another marker for the same property is nearer the street.
Hutchings House		14875	2816 Ave. O 29°17′34″N 94°47′47″W	Galveston	1962	Marker near street, facing Avenue O. Another marker for the same property is on the house.
Hutchings, Sealy & Co. Building⁂‡	More images	7496	2326-2328 Strand (Ave. B) 29°18′26″N 94°47′43″W	Galveston	1993	
Isaac H. and Henrietta Kempner House⁂‡		7505	1502 Broadway St. (Ave. J) 29°18′10″N 94°47′0″W	Galveston	1994	
Isaac Heffron House⁂‡	More images	18528	1509 Postoffice St. (Ave. E) 29°18′24″N 94°47′5″W	Galveston	2016	
Isabella Offenbach Maas Residence⁂‡		7520	1727 Sealy St. (Ave. I) 29°18′9″N 94°47′11″W	Galveston	1986	
J. F. Smith & Brothers (STOLEN)⁂‡		15085	2321-2323 Strand (Ave. B) 29°18′24″N 94°47′43″W	Galveston	1962	
J. F. Smith House		7186	2217 Broadway St. (Ave. J) 29°18′0″N 94°47′29″W	Galveston	1990	
Jackie Andrews Private School		9922	1807 Church St. (Ave. F) 29°18′18″N 94°47′16″W	Galveston	1962	
James N. Davis House‡		7426	1315 Mitchell Ave. (24th St.) 29°17′48″N 94°47′32″W	Galveston	1979	
James S. Waters House⁂‡		18526	1116 Church St. (Ave. F) 29°18′27″N 94°46′47″W	Galveston	2016	
John M. Jones House‡		7498	1725 Ave. M 29°17′56″N 94°47′6″W	Galveston	1979	
John Smith House		7187	1116 36th St. 29°17′41″N 94°48′22″W	Galveston	1987	
John and Eliza Hertford House⁂‡		7489	1509 Broadway St. (Ave. J) 29°18′8″N 94°47′0″W	Galveston	1993	
Julius H. Ruhl Residence⁂‡	More images	7168	1428 Sealy St. (Ave. I) 29°18′14″N 94°46′59″W	Galveston	1984	
Landes-McDonough House⁂‡	More images	7511	1602 Postoffice St. (Ave. E) 29°18′25″N 94°47′9″W	Galveston	1973	
Lasker Home for Children†‡		7512	1019 16th St. 29°18′2″N 94°47′1″W	Galveston	1980	
Lockhart House⁂‡		7518	1502 Ball St. (Ave. H) 29°18′16″N 94°47′2″W	Galveston	1981	
Magale Building⁂‡		7522	2313-15 Strand (Ave. B) 29°18′24″N 94°47′42″W	Galveston	1978	
Mallory-Produce Building⁂‡	More images	7526	2110-2114 Strand (Ave. B) 29°18′28″N 94°47′34″W	Galveston	1987	
Masonic Temple, Old (BURNED)		15112	2027 Postoffice St. (Ave. E) 29°18′18″N 94°47′27″W	Galveston	1962	
Mathilda Wehmeyer German-American Kindergarten School	More images	18647	1616 Winnie St. (Ave. G) 29°18′18″N 94°47′8″W	Galveston	2017	On the lot, facing Winnie
Maud Moller House⁂‡		7533	812 19th St. (Ave. H) 29°18′11″N 94°47′17″W	Galveston	1983	
Menard-Ganter House⁂‡		7528	1209 Winnie St. (Ave. G) 29°18′21″N 94°46′51″W	Galveston	1992	
Miller-Brautigam Home		15345	5518 Main St. 29°21′54″N 95°4′55″W	Santa Fe	2002	
Jacobs Home⁂‡		7532	1323 Church St. (Ave. F) 29°18′23″N 94°46′57″W	Galveston	1977	Plate reported missing Jun 2007. Replaced with different title, now titled "Jacobs Home"
Moody Hall		18817	4015 Ave. Q 29°17′4″N 94°48′31″W	Galveston	2017	Southwest corner of 41st Street and Avenue Q to Southeast corner of 40th Street and Avenue Q, located at 4015 Avenue Q between Seawall Boulevard and Broadway Boulevard in Galveston, Texas
Old Austin Home⁂‡	More images	9926	1502 Market St. (Ave. D) 29°18′29″N 94°47′6″W	Galveston	1962	
Old Ball Home‡	More images	60	1405 Mitchell Ave. (24th St.) 29°17′45″N 94°47′32″W	Galveston	1962	
Old H. B. Moore Home†		7536	8 Ninth Ave. N 29°23′38″N 94°54′10″W	Texas City	1968	8 Ninth Ave. N at Bay St.; Marker reported missing Aug. 2008.
Old Red, Ashbel Smith Building†#	More images	7539	916 Strand (Ave. B) 29°18′48″N 94°46′44″W	Galveston	1969	
Open Gates†	More images	7541	2424 Broadway St. (Ave. J) 29°17′59″N 94°47′37″W	Galveston	1962	George and Magnolia Willis Sealy Conference Center, aka George Sealy House.
Poole-Parker House		7545	3419 Ave. L 29°17′40″N 94°48′17″W	Galveston	1980	
Powhatan House†	More images	7546	3427 Ave. O 29°17′24″N 94°48′11″W	Galveston	1967	
Powhatan and Mattie Wren House⁂‡		14023	1403 Broadway St. (Ave. J) 29°18′9″N 94°46′54″W	Galveston	2007	1403 Broadway
Produce Building⁂‡	More images	15645	2110-2114 Strand (Ave. B) 29°18′28″N 94°47′34″W	Galveston	1962	
Quigg-Baulard Cottage†		18525	2628 Broadway St. (Ave. J) 29°17′57″N 94°47′48″W	Galveston	2016	
Reedy Chapel A. M. E. Church†		7548	2013 Broadway St. (Ave. J) 29°18′0″N 94°47′19″W	Galveston	1975	
Sacred Heart Church⁂‡	More images	7170	1302 Broadway St. (Ave. J) 29°18′12″N 94°46′53″W	Galveston	1981	
Santa Fe Consolidated High School		17644	13304 SH 6 29°22′43″N 95°6′19″W	Santa Fe	2013	
Santa Fe Union Station⁂‡	More images	7178	123 Rosenberg Ave. (25th St.) 29°18′23″N 94°47′50″W	Galveston	1983	
Schreiber-Miller Warehouse⁂‡		7179	2317-2319 Strand (Ave. B) 29°18′24″N 94°47′42″W	Galveston	1962	
Site of Old Saint Mary's Infirmary		7174	715 Market St. (Ave. D) 29°18′35″N 94°46′34″W	Galveston	1962	
Sonnentheil Home⁂‡		11566	1826 Sealy St. (Ave. I) 29°18′9″N 94°47′15″W	Galveston	1962	
St. Joseph's Church†		14117	2201 Ave. K 29°17′57″N 94°47′26″W	Galveston	1978	
St. Mary's Cathedral†	More images	7172	2011 Church St. (Ave. F) 29°18′14″N 94°47′24″W	Galveston	1967	
Sweeney-Royston House†‡		11571	2402 Ave. L 29°17′52″N 94°47′32″W	Galveston	1978	
T. J. and Mary Lelia Dick House		7429	720 Second St. 29°30′47″N 95°5′25″W	League City	1993	720 Second St. at Kansas
The Bishop's Palace⁂†‡	More images	139	1402 Broadway St. (Ave. J) 29°18′17″N 94°46′55″W	Galveston	1967	
The Cottage⁂‡		8239	1517 Ball St. (Ave. H) 29°18′14″N 94°47′3″W	Galveston	1966	1517 Avenue H, Galveston
The Cradle		8240	2902 Avenue O1/2 29°17′29″N 94°47′49″W	Galveston	1962	29th and O 1/2 Street, Galveston
The Heidenheimer Bros. Marine Building⁂‡		7486	305 Moody Ave. (21st St.) 29°18′24″N 94°47′31″W	Galveston	1986	21st and Mechanic St.
The Italian Vault		7497	2506 65th St. 29°16′21″N 94°49′49″W	Galveston	1992	Calvary Catholic Cemetery, 2506 65th St.
The Maas House⁂‡		7521	1802 Sealy St. (Ave. I) 29°18′10″N 94°47′13″W	Galveston	1976	
The Moody Home†	More images	7534	2618 Broadway St. (Ave. J) 29°17′57″N 94°47′46″W	Galveston	1967	
The Wilbur Cherry House⁂‡	More images	270	1602 Church St. (Ave. F) 29°18′21″N 94°47′7″W	Galveston	1981	
Thomas Chubb House⁂‡		326	1417 Sealy St. (Ave. I) 29°18′12″N 94°46′58″W	Galveston	1981	
Trinity Protestant Episcopal Church†	More images	11580	708 Kempner Ave. (22nd St.) 29°18′10″N 94°47′32″W	Galveston	1965	
Trube House⁂‡	More images	11581	1627 Sealy St. (Ave. I) 29°18′10″N 94°47′7″W	Galveston	1965	
Trueheart-Adriance Building⁂†‡	More images	11582	212 Kempner Ave. (22nd St.) 29°18′24″N 94°47′33″W	Galveston	1973	
W. P. Ballinger Law Firm		63	2228 Mechanic St. (Ave. C), Suite 400 29°18′23″N 94°47′38″W	Galveston	1967	2228 Mechanic, Suite 400 in Washington Building, Galveston
Wegner House		17946	1328 Ave. K 29°18′7″N 94°46′52″W	Galveston	2014	
Wesley Tabernacle United Methodist Church		13986	902 28th St. 29°17′58″N 94°47′52″W	Galveston	2007	902 28th St.
William J. Killeen House‡		7506	1808 Ave. K 29°18′3″N 94°47′11″W	Galveston	1980	
William and Adele Skinner House⁂‡		18752	1318 Sealy St. (Ave. I) 29°18′15″N 94°46′54″W	Galveston	2017	1318 Sealy lot, facing Sealy
Williams-Tucker House, 1837–40†	More images	11596	3601 Bernardo de Gálvez St. (Ave. P) 29°17′16″N 94°48′15″W	Galveston	1964	

== Garza County ==
Registered Texas Historic Landmark	Image	Marker number	Physical address	Nearest city	Year designated	Description
C. W. Post Home		601	615 W. Main St. 33°11′26″N 101°23′9″W	Post	1964	615 West Main, Post
Faith Lutheran Church		1559	124 N. Ave. K 33°11′33″N 101°22′45″W	Post	1965	corner of 10th Street and Avenue K
Garza County Courthouse†	More images	12456	300 W. Main St. 33°11′27″N 101°22′53″W	Post	2000	
Garza County's First Oil Well		12661	3.5 mi. E of historical marker along US 84 in Justiceburg 33°2′26″N 101°22′7″W	Justiceburg	1967	US 84, 450 ft. NW of Post Office
J. M. Boren Home		2681	504 W. 12th St. 33°11′42″N 101°23′2″W	Post	1967	504 West 12th Street, Post
Mason Memorial Building†	More images	3239	117 N. Ave. N 33°11′31″N 101°23′2″W	Post	1967	
OS Ranch		3643	US 84 SE 8 mi. from Post 33°6′11″N 101°15′41″W	Post	1966	from Post, take Highway 84 about 8 miles Southeast, adjacent to highway-rest area
Old Close City School		3710	NE corner FM 399 and CR 230 33°12′41″N 101°29′11″W	Post	1968	Close City Community Center, from Post, take US 380 about 5 miles W to FM 399 N, and follow FM 399 about 1 mile North; MARKER REPORTED MISSING 9/09.
Old Post Sanitarium†	More images	3783	117 N. Ave. N 33°11′31″N 101°23′1″W	Post	1964	117 Avenue N, Post
Post-Hundley House		5403	111 E. 11th St. 33°11′36″N 101°22′39″W	Post	1976	111 East 11th Street, Post
Postex Cotton Mill		4089	300 S. Ave F 33°11′16″N 101°22′21″W	Post	1962	Corner of South Avenue F and East 7th, Post
Verbena Community Church		5642	Near jct. FM 2008 and CR 186 33°16′35″N 101°11′45″W	Post	1965	From Post, take Hwy. 380 East about 10 miles, then take Hwy. 2008 about 5 miles north

== Gillespie County ==
Registered Texas Historic Landmark	Image	Marker number	Physical address	Nearest city	Year designated	Description
Adolph Gold House		10046	212 E. Travis St. 30°16′33″N 98°52′0″W	Fredericksburg	1991	
Albert Lee Patton Building‡		10093	232 W. Main St. 30°16′39″N 98°52′30″W	Fredericksburg	1981	
Albert Nebgen House		10088	613 Lee Roy Behrends Rd. 30°13′20″N 98°38′21″W	Stonewall	1988	from Stonewall take RR 1623 S approx. 1 mi. to Lee Roy Behrends Rd.; take Behrends east approx. .6 mile to the DE Ranch entrance, take DE Road approx. .4 mile
Cherry Mountain School Complex		10015	5973 RM 2323 30°27′43″N 98°56′54″W	Fredericksburg	1992	take US 87 NE 7.4 mi., then take Cherry Mountain Loop Rd. 1.8 mi.
Cherry Spring Schoolhouse†		10017	5973 RM 2323 30°27′50″N 98°56′54″W	Fredericksburg	1988	take US 87 NW 7.5 miles to RM 2323, then north on RM 2323 six miles
Christian Crenwelge Place		10023	312 W. Schubert St. 30°16′51″N 98°52′30″W	Fredericksburg	1979	
County Jail of 1885‡		10021	117 San Antonio St. 30°16′28″N 98°52′28″W	Fredericksburg	1980	
D. C. Riley House		10101	Itz-Kast Rd. 0.2 mi. N of Lower Crabapple Rd. 30°26′0″N 98°57′51″W	Fredericksburg	1972	take RR 965 N approx. 17 miles to Lower Crabapple Rd.; then east on Crab Apple 2.6 miles to Itz-Kast Rd.; then north on Itz .2 miles
Dangers Stone House‡		10027	213 W. Creek St. 30°16′29″N 98°52′38″W	Fredericksburg	1974	
Diedrich Rode Complex	More images	10104	Cherry Spring Rd. near V-K Rd. 30°28′56″N 98°59′6″W	Fredericksburg	1982	take US 87 N approx. 17 miles; then east on cherry Spring Rd. 1.2 miles
Domino Parlor‡		10029	222 E. Main St. 30°16′25″N 98°52′12″W	Fredericksburg	1980	
Duecker Family Homestead		10031	N. Grape Creek Rd. 30°20′4″N 98°38′47″W	Fredericksburg	1993	FM 1631 east 6.7 miles, FM 2721 east approx. 8 mi., Grape Creek Road north 3.5 miles
Durst House		10032	2175 Wendell-Ahrens Rd. 30°23′8″N 98°55′24″W	Fredericksburg	1991	take US 87 NW 8 miles to Cherry Mtn. Loop Rd.; then east on Cherry Mtn. Rd. 1.8 miles to Wandell-Ahrens Rd., then north on Wendell .4 miles to site
Edward and Minnie Stein House		10118	101 E. Hackberry St. 30°16′55″N 98°51′54″W	Fredericksburg	1994	
Ellebracht-Moritz Homestead		10034	3574 RM 965 30°19′22″N 98°51′35″W	Fredericksburg	1987	private property
Emil Weber House		10128	110 N. Cherry St. 30°17′5″N 98°53′0″W	Fredericksburg	1982	
F. W. Arhelger Shop‡		10008	109 N. Adams St. 30°16′32″N 98°52′18″W	Fredericksburg	1980	
Felix Van Der Stucken Home‡		10120	114 W. Austin St. 30°16′38″N 98°52′20″W	Fredericksburg	1981	
Frank Van Der Stucken Birthplace‡		14946	123 E. Main St. 30°16′28″N 98°52′18″W	Fredericksburg	1962	
Fredericksburg College Building		10040	108 W. Travis St. 30°16′47″N 98°52′12″W	Fredericksburg	1971	
Gold-Grobe House		10047	413 N. Llano St. 30°16′38″N 98°52′2″W	Fredericksburg	1989	
Gruen-Doebbler Homestead		16454	1251 Doebbler Rd. 30°8′40″N 98°50′21″W	Fredericksburg	2010	
H. C. Keese Home		10058	Welgehausen Rd. 30°38′32″N 98°52′26″W	Fredericksburg	1981	from Crabapple take RR 965 N approx. .75 mi. to Welgehausen Rd.; then west on Welgehausen Rd. 3.4 miles to site on right
Harper Presbyterian Church		10051	147 Oak Ave. 30°18′3″N 99°15′11″W	Harper	1976	IS Hwy. 280 and FM 783
Heinrich Bierschwale House‡		10012	209 W. Austin St. 30°16′41″N 98°52′27″W	Fredericksburg	1987	
Henry Basse House		10010	1004 S. Bowie St. 30°16′46″N 98°53′31″W	Fredericksburg	1991	at US Hwy. 290 and Basse Ln. take Basse Ln. south .4 mi. to S. Bowie and go east 100 yards
Henry Cordes House		10020	204 W. Schubert St. 30°16′44″N 98°52′20″W	Fredericksburg	1981	
Hoerster Building‡		10055	242-244 W. Main St. 30°16′40″N 98°52′31″W	Fredericksburg	1988	
Holy Ghost (Heilige Geist) Evangelical Protestant Church‡		10056	113 E. San Antonio St. 30°16′22″N 98°52′21″W	Fredericksburg	1981	
Hugo and Anna Gold Crenwelge House		10024	Gold-Shafer Rd. 1.3 mi. S of Old Willow Rd. 30°22′32″N 98°42′31″W	Fredericksburg	1990	take SH 16 N 13 mi. to RR 1323; then east on RR 1323 2.7 mi. to Old Willow Rd., then south on Old Willow Rd. .5 mi. to Gold-Schafer Rd., then south on Gold-Schafer Rd. 1.3 miles
J. W. and Ruth Baines House		12975	112 W. College St. 30°16′49″N 98°52′7″W	Fredericksburg	2002	Fredericksburg, 112 W. College Street
Johann Joseph Knopp House‡		10066	309 W. Schubert St. 30°16′50″N 98°52′30″W	Fredericksburg	1971	
John Peter Tatsch Home, 1856‡	More images	10121	210 N. Bowie St. 30°16′55″N 98°51′54″W	Fredericksburg	1965	
Kiehne-Hermann Home‡	More images	10065	405 E. Main St. 30°16′15″N 98°52′1″W	Fredericksburg	1976	
Klingelhoeffer House‡		17349	701 W. Main St. 30°16′57″N 98°52′58″W	Fredericksburg	2012	Southwest corner of W. Main St. and S. Acorn St.
Kloth-Ludwig Home‡		10067	414 E. Main St. 30°16′16″N 98°51′58″W	Fredericksburg	1980	
Kuenemann House‡		11893	413 W. Creek St. 30°16′39″N 98°52′52″W	Fredericksburg	1997	
Lehne-Itz House		10069	402 Whitney St. 30°16′27″N 98°53′0″W	Fredericksburg	1993	
Little Rock House‡		10103	215B W. Main St. 30°16′36″N 98°52′29″W	Fredericksburg	1965	
Liveoak Creek Log Cabin		10061	Loudon Rd. 2.5 mi. N of US 290 30°18′33″N 98°57′40″W	Fredericksburg	1976	private property
Loeffler-Weber House‡		10072	508 W. Main St. 30°16′50″N 98°52′45″W	Fredericksburg	1971	
Lower South Grape Creek School†		10073	10273 E. US 290 30°13′29″N 98°43′41″W	Stonewall	1994	from Stonewall take US 290 E approx. 10 miles, ROW
Luckenbach School†		10075	3566 Luckenbach Rd. 30°11′12″N 98°45′16″W	Luckenbach	1982	from RR 1376 in Luckenbach take Luckenbach Rd. E approx. .5 miles
Ludwig Doebbler House		16447	542 Doebbler Rd. 30°8′55″N 98°49′43″W	Fredericksburg	2010	
Lyndon Baines Johnson⁕‡	More images	10062	Park Road 49 30°14′27″N 98°37′27″W	Stonewall	1967	LBJ National Park (near entrance on PR 49)
Maier-Alberthal Building‡		10078	324 E. Main St. 30°16′20″N 98°52′4″W	Fredericksburg	1983	
Meckel-Hanus Building‡		10081	307 W. Main St. 30°16′40″N 98°52′35″W	Fredericksburg	1986	
Moritz-Hitzfeld-Jacoby House		10085	608 N. Milam St. 30°17′3″N 98°52′22″W	Fredericksburg	1994	
Morris Ranch Schoolhouse†		10086	Morris Ranch Rd. 30°13′7″N 99°0′56″W	Fredericksburg	1981	from intersection of US 290 and SH 16 in Fredericksburg, take SH 16 S approx. 9 miles to Morris Ranch Rd.; then west on ranch road approx. 2.4 miles
Mosel-Jordan-Duecker Haus‡		10087	121 E. San Antonio St. 30°16′24″N 98°52′22″W	Fredericksburg	1986	
Moseley Log Cabin‡		14225	307 W. Schubert St. 30°16′51″N 98°52′29″W	Fredericksburg	1964	
Mueller-Petmecky House		10083	201 S. Washington St. 30°16′11″N 98°52′8″W	Fredericksburg	1983	
Old Gillespie County Courthouse†‡#	More images	10045	101 & 115 W. Main St. 30°16′31″N 98°52′24″W	Fredericksburg	1967	W. Main and S. Adams
Old Kammlah House‡	More images	10064	309 - 315 W. Main St. 30°16′40″N 98°52′35″W	Fredericksburg	1966	
Old St. Mary's Church (Die Alte Kirche)‡	More images	15401	300 W. San Antonio St. 30°16′37″N 98°52′36″W	Fredericksburg	1994	
Our Lady of Guadalupe Catholic Church		14535	302 E. College St. 30°16′38″N 98°51′51″W	Fredericksburg	1994	
Pape Log Cabin‡		10092	213 W. Creek St. 30°16′29″N 98°52′38″W	Fredericksburg	1974	
Pioneer Schandua House‡		10110	111 E. Austin St. 30°16′31″N 98°52′14″W	Fredericksburg	1980	
Pioneer Store & Home‡		14969	309 W. Main St. 30°16′40″N 98°52′35″W	Fredericksburg	1966	
Rausch Ranch Home		10098	Meusebach Creek Rd. at WM Hahn Rd. 30°11′45″N 98°50′33″W	Fredericksburg	1983	go south on US 87 approx. 5.5 miles to Meusebach Rd.; then east 1.5 mi. to gate; then 400 ft. to "Y" at creek; then .3 mi. east to gate; then .4 mi. south to site
Ressmann-Boos House		10100	511 E. Main St. 30°16′11″N 98°51′54″W	Fredericksburg	1983	
Riley-Enderlin House		10102	606 N. Adams St. 30°16′48″N 98°52′3″W	Fredericksburg	1987	
Schmidt-Dietz Building‡		10111	218 W. Main St. 30°16′38″N 98°52′28″W	Fredericksburg	1981	
Schmidt-Gold House‡		10112	106 S. Lincoln St. 30°16′20″N 98°52′11″W	Fredericksburg	1981	
Schneider-Klingelhoefer House		10114	714 W. Main St. 30°17′1″N 98°53′1″W	Fredericksburg	1988	
Schwarz Building‡		10115	216 W. Main St. 30°16′38″N 98°52′28″W	Fredericksburg	1981	
Site of The Andreas Lindig Lime Kiln		10071	Rest area between RR 1 and US 290 30°14′13″N 98°36′35″W	Stonewall	1970	Gillespie County Safety Rest Area, Lower Albert Road
St. Barnabas Episcopal Church‡		10105	601 W. Creek St. 30°16′45″N 98°53′0″W	Fredericksburg	1962	W. Creek St. and S. owie St.
St. John's Lutheran Church		10106	14689 Lower Crabapple Rd. 30°26′23″N 98°49′57″W	Fredericksburg	1994	take RR 965 N approx. 10 miles; take left at "Y" just south of Crab Apple Creek Bridge and go .5 mi.
St. Mary's Catholic Church†‡	More images	14697	304 W. San Antonio St. 30°16′37″N 98°52′37″W	Fredericksburg	1995	
St. Paul Lutheran Church		10107	9732 RM 1631 30°11′45″N 98°50′33″W	Fredericksburg	1969	take RR 1631 NE approx. 10 miles
St. Peter Lutheran Church		10108	806 N. Lindsey Rd. 30°26′42″N 99°7′48″W	Doss	1993	from Harper take rr 783 approx. 14 miles to intersection of RR 783 and RR 648 in Doss
The August Hennersdorf House‡		10053	205 W. Austin St. 30°16′40″N 98°52′26″W	Fredericksburg	1982	
The Burrer Home		10013	Baj Ln. 0.3 mi. E of Lower Crabapple Rd. 30°20′18″N 98°49′28″W	Fredericksburg	1981	take Lower Crabapple Rd. northeast 4 mi. to Baj Lane, then east on Baj Lane .3 mi.
The Carl Henke Home		10052	116 E. Travis St. 30°16′37″N 98°52′5″W	Fredericksburg	1978	
The Christian Kraus Homestead		10060	0.75 mi. W of US 87 2 mi. W of town 30°19′12″N 98°55′2″W	Fredericksburg	1984	
The Grapetown School		10048	7325 Old San Antonio Rd. 30°8′53″N 98°49′5″W	Fredericksburg	1984	take US 290 E approx. 3 mi. to the Old San Antonio Rd.; then south approx 7.2 miles to Grapetown
The Meinhardt-Pfeil Home‡	More images	10082	125 W. San Antonio St. 30°16′30″N 98°52′30″W	Fredericksburg	1981	
The Patton Home		10094	107 N. Orange St. 30°16′42″N 98°52′30″W	Fredericksburg	1981	
The Schandua Building‡		10109	205 E. Main St. 30°16′25″N 98°52′14″W	Fredericksburg	1979	
The William Rausch House‡		10099	107 S. Lincoln St. 30°16′19″N 98°52′10″W	Fredericksburg	1985	
Trinity Lutheran Church	More images	10122	4270 Ranch Road 1 30°14′13″N 98°36′37″W	Stonewall	1989	take US 290 E approx. 1 mile to Lower Albert Rd.; take Albert Rd. north approx. .2 miles to intersection with RR 1
Vereins Kirche‡	More images	10123	115 Pioneer Plaza 30°16′35″N 98°52′21″W	Fredericksburg	1967	Market Square
Vogel Sunday House‡		10124	418 W. Austin St. 30°16′51″N 98°52′39″W	Fredericksburg	1982	
Wahrmund Millinery, Moellendorf-Dietz Bakery‡		10126	312 E. Main St. 30°16′21″N 98°52′6″W	Fredericksburg	1978	
Wahrmund-Priess House		12488	575 Buckeye Rd. 30°11′11″N 98°57′0″W	Fredericksburg	2001	
Walch Home		10127	412 E. Austin St. 30°16′21″N 98°51′57″W	Fredericksburg	1978	
Walter-Jenschke Sunday House	More images	15200	406 W. Travis St. 30°16′55″N 98°52′31″W	Fredericksburg	1991	
Weber "Das Keller Haus"		10129	110 N. Cherry St. 30°17′5″N 98°53′1″W	Fredericksburg	1982	
Welgenhausen Ranch		10130	12800 RM 965 30°26′35″N 98°50′18″W	Fredericksburg	1983	from Fredericksburg take RR 965 N approx. 12.6 miles to site just north of Crabapple
William Wahrmund House‡		10125	206 W. Main St. 30°16′37″N 98°52′27″W	Fredericksburg	1977	
Williams Creek School†		15250	5501 S. RM 1623 30°11′45″N 98°36′1″W	Stonewall vicinity	2002	Albert community
Zion Evangelical Lutheran Church‡	More images	10132	424 W. Main St. 30°16′49″N 98°52′43″W	Fredericksburg	1964	

== Glasscock County ==
Registered Texas Historic Landmark	Image	Marker number	Physical address	Nearest city	Year designated	Description
Glasscock County Courthouse and Jail†#		2188	117 E. Currie Ave. 31°51′49″N 101°28′49″W	Garden City	1993	FM 158, Courthouse grounds, Garden City

== Goliad County ==
Registered Texas Historic Landmark	Image	Marker number	Physical address	Nearest city	Year designated	Description
Brooking-Lipscomb-White House		520	142 W. End St. 28°39′58″N 97°23′37″W	Goliad	1986	142 W. End St.
Elijah Ray House		1450	8 mi. SW on FM 2442 28°40′17″N 97°41′18″W	Charco	1984	From Charco, take FM 2442 8 miles SW.
Geraldos B. Smart House		2173	3 mi. E on US 59	Goliad	1962	MARKER NOT LOCATED; previously: from Goliad, take US 59 3 miles NE; private—no access.
Goliad County Courthouse‡#	More images	2204	300 S. Market St. 28°39′57″N 97°23′31″W	Goliad	1964	Courthouse Square, S. Market Street, Goliad
Goliad Lodge No. 94 A.F. & A.M.‡		2205	202 Commercial St. 28°40′1″N 97°23′34″W	Goliad	1967	Corner of Commercial and Franklin Streets
Judge Pryor Lea, Home		2883	W. Franklin St. at S. Chilton Ave. 28°40′2″N 97°23′37″W	Goliad	1962	201 W. Franklin St.
Market House Museum†‡#		3217	205 S. Market St. 28°40′1″N 97°23′31″W	Goliad	1968	At intersection of S. Market and Franklin Streets, Goliad.
Mission Nuestra Senora del Espiritu Santo de Zuniga†‡§#	More images	3408	108 PR 6 28°39′26″N 97°23′12″W	Goliad	1969	From Goliad, take US 183/77A south about 1 mile to Goliad State Park—on mission wall.
Old Peck House†	More images	3686	248 Hill Ave. 28°39′59″N 97°24′5″W	Goliad	1962	From Goliad, take US 59 west about 1 mile, private property - no access.
Presidio de Nuestra Senora de Loreto de la Bahia⁕	More images	4119	217 US 183 / US 77 Alt. 28°38′51″N 97°22′57″W	Goliad	1969	From Goliad, take US 183/77A south about 1 mile to Presidio Chapel entrance on Spur 71.
Ramsey Home		4176	205 E. Garden St. 28°40′9″N 97°23′26″W	Goliad	1962	205 Garden Street, Goliad.
Reed-McCampbell-Wiess Ranch Complex		4223	4 mi. NW on FM 883 28°34′1″N 97°38′56″W	Berclair	1991	From Berclair, take FM 883 NW about 4 miles.
Site of September 1824 Indian Treaty		4885	4 mi. E on US 59	Goliad	1967	MARKER MISSING; concrete base of marker remains, from Goliad, take US 59 east about 4 miles.
Stoddard-Collins House†		5128	400 E. Fannin St. 28°39′54″N 97°23′18″W	Goliad	1993	Corner of Fannin and Jefferson Streets, Goliad.
W. J. "Ed" and Mary Elizabeth Lott House		5673	2 mi. W of US 59 on FM 1351	Goliad	1996	5 miles southwest of Goliad on US 59; 2 miles west on FM 1351

== Gonzales County ==
Registered Texas Historic Landmark	Image	Marker number	Physical address	Nearest city	Year designated	Description
Braches House†	More images	482	12 mi. SE of Gonzales off U.S. 90A 29°28′33″N 97°18′32″W	Gonzales	1962	From Gonzales, take U.S. 90 a E about 10 mile, go .5 miles W. on County Road 361.
Brown House		532	834 Mitchell St. 29°29′54″N 97°26′40″W	Gonzales	1963	834 Mitchell St
Charles T. Rather House		821	828 St. Louis St. 29°30′7″N 97°26′47″W	Gonzales	1975	
Chenault House (DEMOLISHED)		15304	324 St. Paul St. 29°30′2″N 97°27′3″W	Gonzales	1962	
Episcopal Church of the Messiah		1491	711 St. Louis St. 29°30′7″N 97°26′56″W	Gonzales	1981	
Gonzales College		2217	820 St. Louis St. 29°30′7″N 97°26′49″W	Gonzales	1962	
Gonzales County Jail†‡#	More images	2218	414 St. Lawrence St. 29°30′5″N 97°27′7″W	Gonzales	1966	
Gonzales Courthouse†‡#	More images	2219	414 St. Joseph St. 29°30′4″N 97°27′8″W	Gonzales	1966	
Gonzales Memorial Museum and Amphitheatre†#	More images	2220	414 Smith St. 29°30′14″N 97°26′37″W	Gonzales	2003	at St. Louis St.
Harwood Methodist Church and Masonic Lodge	More images	2402	N. Second St. by Harwood Cemetery 29°40′9″N 97°30′9″W	Harwood	1979	Stelle St. at N. Second St., Harwood.
Holmes Hospital	More images	2513	1118 St. Louis St. 29°30′11″N 97°26′36″W	Gonzales	1984	
J. W. and Nannie C. Bailey House		277	623 St. Michael St. 29°29′59″N 97°26′54″W	Gonzales	1996	
John Fauth House		1578	521 St. Peter St. 29°30′11″N 97°27′4″W	Gonzales	1965	
Kennard House†		2924	621 St. Louis St. 29°30′6″N 97°26′57″W	Gonzales	1967	
Leesville Baptist Church		3066	6055 FM 1682 29°24′26″N 97°44′9″W	Leesville	1976	FM 1682, 3/4 mile E of Intersection of SA 80 & FM 1682, Leesville
Market Square‡		3219	Block bounded by St. Lawrence St., St. John St., St. Louis St., and Water St. 29°30′0″N 97°27′20″W	Gonzales	1966	St. John St. between St Louis and St. Lawrence, Gonzales
Miller's Store		3381	N. Railroad St. at N. Main St. 29°41′35″N 97°17′53″W	Waelder	1968	Hwy. 90 W, Waelder.
Remschel House		11900	524 St. Peter St. 29°30′12″N 97°27′2″W	Gonzales	1997	
Riverside School		18947	110 St. Lawrence St. 29°30′1″N 97°27′21″W	Gonzales	2018	
The Eggleston House	More images	1405	1303 St. Louis St. 29°30′15″N 97°26′31″W	Gonzales	1962	in park, 1300 block St. Louis St.
The Pilgrim Home		5400	707 St. George St. 29°30′14″N 97°26′58″W	Gonzales	1965	
Wells Home		5751	833 Mitchell St. 29°29′55″N 97°26′41″W	Gonzales	1964	
William B. and Sue J. Houston House†		13016	621 St. George St. 29°30′13″N 97°27′1″W	Gonzales	2003	621 East Saint George Street

== Gray County ==
Registered Texas Historic Landmark	Image	Marker number	Physical address	Nearest city	Year designated	Description
1934 Pampa Post Office Building†		36	120 E. Foster Ave. 35°32′10″N 100°57′36″W	Pampa	1992	
1931 Combs-Worley Building†		11901	120 W. Kingsmill Ave. 35°32′12″N 100°57′46″W	Pampa	1998	
Gray County Courthouse†		11902	205 N. Russell St. 35°32′12″N 100°57′50″W	Pampa	1997	Kingsmill & Russell
Pampa City Hall†		3923	200 W. Foster Ave. 35°32′8″N 100°57′46″W	Pampa	1987	1 Albert Square, Pampa (faces Courthouse Square on Kingsmill).
Pioneer Cottage		4027	100 E. Atchison Ave. 35°32′6″N 100°57′37″W	Pampa	1970	corner of Yeager Street and Starkweather in City Park area, Pampa.

== See also ==
Recorded Texas Historic Landmarks listed by county
Anderson-Callahan • Cameron-Duval • Eastland-Gray • Grayson-Hudspeth • Hunt-Martin • Mason-Rusk • Sabine-Travis • Trinity-Zavala
