= Crabapple Fire =

2025 wildfire in Texas, USA

- Part of the 2025 Texas wildfires
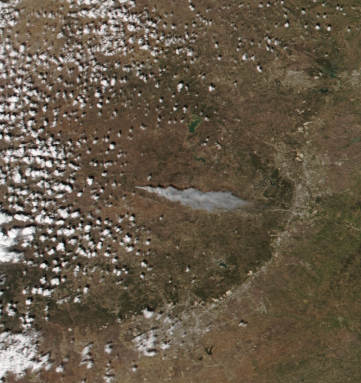
- The smoke plume from the Crabapple Fire on March 15
- Date: March 15, 2025 - March 21, 2025
- Location: Gillespie County, Texas, U.S.
- Coordinates: 30°23′32.83″N 98°47′0.05″W

Statistics
- Status: Extinguished
- Perimeter: 100% contained
- Burned area: approx. 9,858 acres (15 mi^{2}; 3,989 ha)

Impacts
- Deaths: 0
- Injuries: 1
- Evacuated: Unknown
- Structures destroyed: 9 residences destroyed, 20 outbuildings destroyed

Ignition
- Cause: Unknown

Map
- Perimeter of the Crabapple Fire (map data)

The Crabapple Fire was a wildfire in Gillespie County, Texas, northeast of Fredericksburg. The fire was first reported on March 15, 2025, at approximately 1:32 p.m. CT near 8739 Lower Crabapple Road. As of March 21, 2025, the fire had burned approximately 9,858 acres and was 100% contained. The cause of the fire remains under investigation.

== Progression ==
The Crabapple Fire ignited on March 15, 2025, under conditions of high winds and low humidity, which contributed to its rapid spread. The fire quickly grew to 5,000 acres within the first 24 hours and continued expanding due to shifting winds. Fire crews worked to slow its progression, utilizing bulldozers, aerial retardant drops, and controlled burns to create containment lines. The fire fighting effort faced challenges due to the rugged terrain and strong winds, with gusts reaching up to 35 mph. However, by March 17, favorable weather conditions helped increase containment efforts, allowing firefighters to gain control over key areas. Officials announced the fire had been fully contained on March 21.

== Impact ==
The fire destroyed 30 buildings, including nine residences, with two additional residences sustaining damage. One firefighter sustained a minor injury while combating the blaze. Evacuations were conducted on an individual basis, and road closures in the affected areas were lifted as of March 17, 2025. Smoke from the fire affected air quality in surrounding communities, prompting health advisories for sensitive groups.

== Response efforts ==
The Texas A&M Forest Service managed the response, deploying firefighting personnel, aircraft, and ground resources to contain the blaze. As of March 17, a red flag warning remained in effect due to high winds and low humidity, which contributed to the fire’s rapid spread and ongoing containment challenges.

=== Relief and recovery efforts ===
The American Red Cross established a shelter at Zion Lutheran Church in Fredericksburg to assist displaced residents. Additionally, Gillespie County partnered with the OneStar Foundation to create a disaster relief fund aimed at supporting recovery efforts for impacted individuals and communities.

To assist affected ranchers and livestock owners, a livestock supply point was established at the Gillespie County Fairgrounds in Fredericksburg, accepting donations of hay, feed, and fencing supplies. Local agricultural suppliers such as Behrends Feed & Fertilizer, Lochte Feed and General Store, and Allied Ag Services Inc. coordinated donation efforts.

== See also ==
- 2025 United States wildfires
- 2025 Texas wildfires
- Bastrop County Complex Fire
