= Albert Luckenbach =

- Born: 21 March 1851; Gillespie County, Texas
- Died: 26 January 1939 (aged 87); San Antonio, Texas
- Occupation: Postmaster
- Known for: Having two cities in Texas named after him

Carl Albert Luckenbach was the first postmaster of Luckenbach, Texas. He would later move to another village which would become known as Albert, Texas. He was the son of the early Texas settler Jacob Luckenbach (1817–1911).
