= Williams Creek School (Gillespie County, Texas) =

- U.S. National Register of Historic Places
- Recorded Texas Historic Landmark
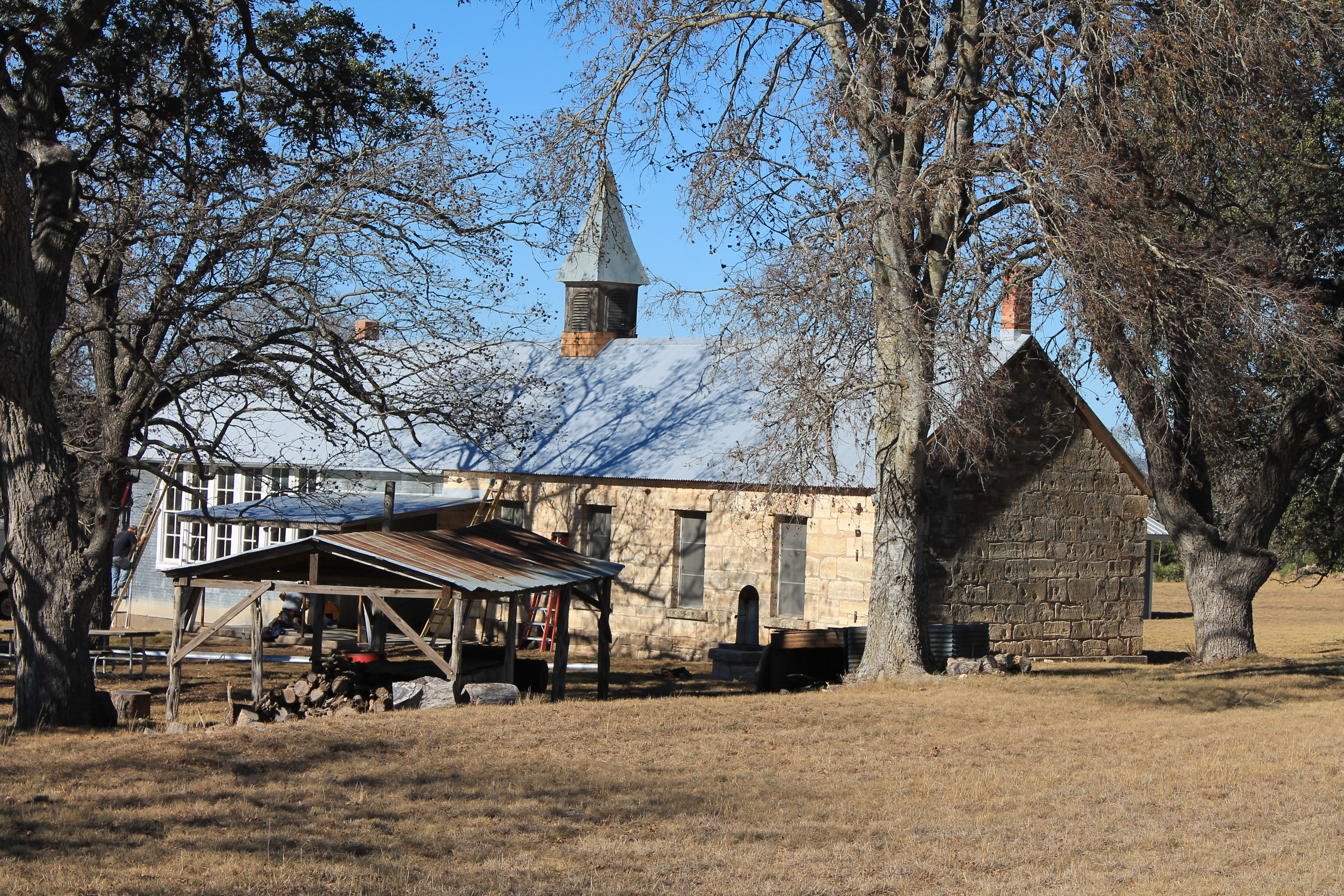
- Williams Creek School

- Location within Texas Location within the United States
- Location: 5501 S. RM 1623
- Nearest city: Stonewall, Texas
- Coordinates: 30°11′45″N 98°36′1″W
- Area: 5.5 acres (2.2 ha)
- Built: 1897
- NRHP reference No.: 05000384
- RTHL No.: 15250

Significant dates
- Added to NRHP: May 6, 2005
- Designated RTHL: 2002

Williams Creek School is located at 5501 South Ranch to Market Road 1623 in Gillespie County, in the U.S. state of Texas. Although now consolidated with the community of Stonewall, the school is actually located south of there in the ghost town of Albert. It was established in 1891 as the Albert School, and was originally a log cabin on Williams Creek. Six years later, it was moved farther from the creek onto a larger piece of land. A new building was constructed of native limestone.

Until World War I, classes were taught exclusively in German. The war brought a new law that not only required all classes, except foreign languages, to be in English, but also banned the use of German on school property. During the 1920–1921 school year, Lyndon B. Johnson was an eighth-grade student in the one-room school. An additional room was added in 1922 to accommodate its expanded enrollment. The school was consolidated with Stonewall in 1950.

The building is now used as a community center. The school was designated a Recorded Texas Historic Landmark in 2002. It was added to the National Register of Historic Places listings in Gillespie County, Texas on May 6, 2005.

== See also ==
- National Register of Historic Places listings in Gillespie County, Texas
- Recorded Texas Historic Landmarks in Gillespie County
