= 2025 Texas wildfires =

Natural disasters in the USA

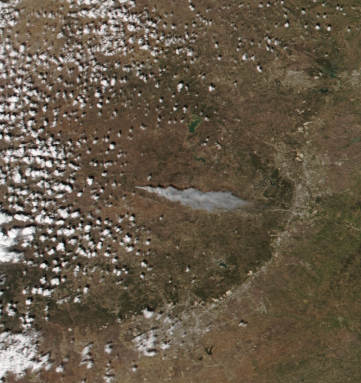
- Smoke from the Crabapple Fire on March 15

The 2025 Texas wildfires were a series of wildfires that burned throughout the U.S. state of Texas.

== Background ==
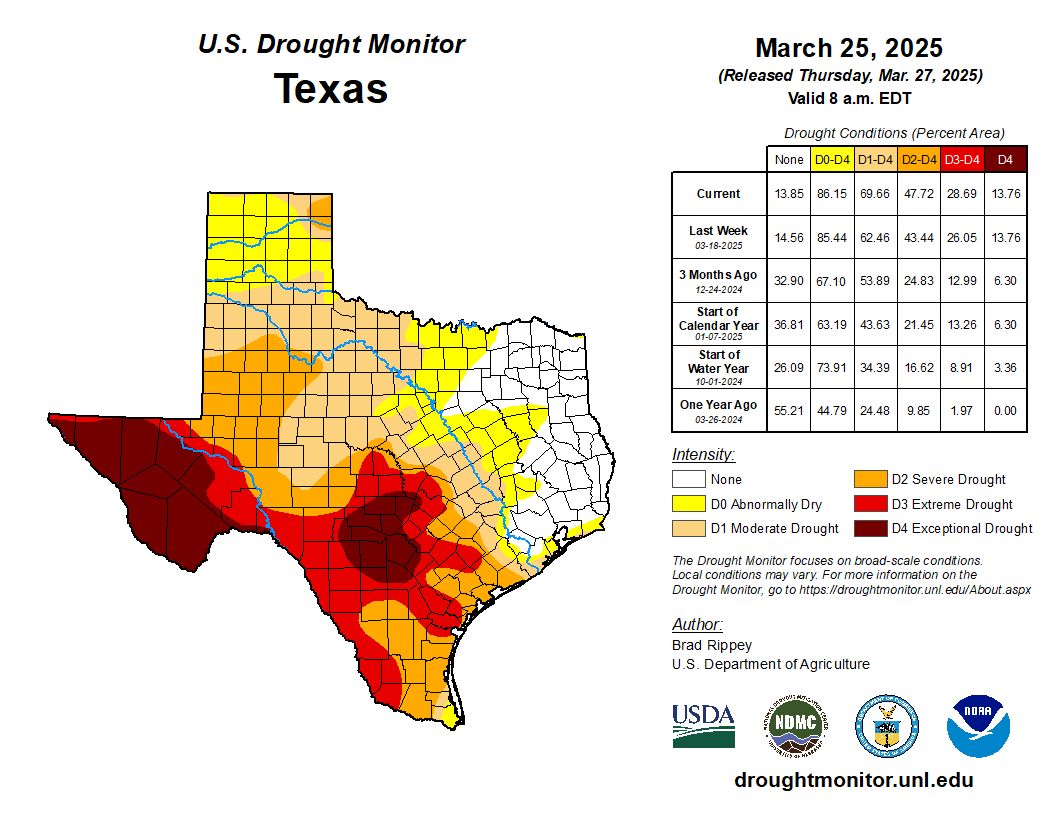
Texas Drought Monitor on March 25, 2025

While "fire season" varies every year in Texas, most wildfires occur in between February and April. However, there is an increasing fire danger all year-round. Fire conditions can be exacerbated by drought, strong winds, La Niña, and vegetation growth. Climate change is leading to increased temperatures, lower humidity levels, and drought conditions that are happening more often.

== Summary ==
Texas's 2025 wildfire season began early, with dry fuels, strong winds, and low humidity contributing to heightened fire danger across many regions. In March, several major grass and brush fires ignited across the Texas Panhandle and Central Texas.

One of the most significant fires was the Crabapple Fire in Gillespie County, which burned about 9,858 acres and destroyed or threatened numerous structures. The fire was fully contained by March 21.

As the season progressed, dry vegetation and drought stress increasingly primed much of East and Central Texas for fire outbreaks. Governor Greg Abbott recently raised the state's Wildland Fire Preparedness Level to Level 3 in response to wildfire activity exceeding 3,000 acres in recent weeks.

Texas A&M Forest Service reports that in a recent reporting period, they responded to 25 new fire incidents burning 379.2 acres statewide, indicating that while many fires are small, the environment remains capable of producing larger events.

State and federal agencies remain on heightened alert, as much of the eastern half of Texas currently has dry vegetation and elevated fire potential. The Texas Fire Potential Update indicates that Central and East Texas will see moderate initial attack fire potential, with short windows of higher danger where conditions allow.

== List of wildfires ==
The following is a list of fires that burned more than 1,000 acres (400 ha), produced significant structural damage, or resulted in casualties.

Name	County	Acres	Start date	Containment date (Note: Containment means that fire crews have established and secured control lines around the fire's perimeter. These lines are artificial barriers, like trenches or cleared vegetation, designed to stop the fire's spread, or natural barriers like rivers. Containment reflects progress in managing the fire but does not necessarily mean the fire is starved of fuel, under control, or put out.)	Notes	Ref.
Blue Hills	Hutchinson, Moore	3,900	February 1	February 4		
Middleton	Chambers	3,089	February 16	February 18		
Twin Oryx	La Salle	2,156	March 4	March 6		
Welder Complex	San Patricio	775	March 4	March 8	Damaged multiple structures and caused four injuries.	
Windmill	Ochiltree, Lipscomb, Roberts	23,287	March 14	March 20		
Rest Area	Gray, Donley	7,931	March 14	March 16		
Crabapple	Gillespie	9,858	March 15	March 21		
Persimmon	Jefferson	1,691	March 16	March 19		
High Lonesome	Dallam	23,335	March 18	March 20		
Pauline Road	San Jacinto, Montgomery	2,421	March 19	March 26		
Salt Lake	Brazoria	1,025	July 30	August 1		
Tule	Swisher, Briscoe	2,548	October 4	October 5	Included two grass fires that burned west of Silverton.	

Perimeters of 2025 Texas wildfires (map data)

== See also ==
- 2025 United States wildfires
