= Eckert, Texas =

- Ghost town
- Location within the state of Texas Eckert (the United States)
- Coordinates: 30°24′52″N 98°44′12″W
- Country: United States
- State: Texas
- County: Gillespie
- Elevation: 1,740 ft (530 m)
- Time zone: UTC-6 (Central (CST))
  - Summer (DST): UTC-5 (CDT)
- Area code: 830
- FIPS code: 48-22492
- GNIS feature ID: 1379698

Eckert is a ghost town, 11.5 miles (18.5 km) northeast of Fredericksburg in Gillespie County, in the U.S. state of Texas. West of Willow City, on FM 1323, Eckert is at the junction of State Highway 16.

White settlers came to the area in 1875 and built Mount Zion, a log church. A small community they named Nebo, after nearby Nebo Mountain 3 miles (4.8 km) north, grew up around the church.

A post office appointment was offered to, and declined by, George W. Graves in 1903. When Wilhelm Rudolph Eckert opened a store in the location in 1903, he became the first postmaster of Eckert. At his request, Nebo was renamed Eckert.

The population peaked in 1925 at 100, but is today a ghost town. It does not have a zip code of its own, but shares the Willow City zip code.
