= Blumenthal, Texas =

- Location within the state of Texas Blumenthal (the United States)
- Coordinates: 30°13′18″N 98°44′29″W
- Country: United States
- State: Texas
- County: Gillespie
- Elevation: 1,506 ft (459 m)

Population (2000)
  - Total: 50
- Time zone: UTC-6 (Central (CST))
  - Summer (DST): UTC-5 (CDT)
- Area code: 830
- FIPS code: 48-09028
- GNIS feature ID: 1378023

Blumenthal is an unincorporated farming and ranching community on the Pedernales River in Gillespie County, in the U.S. state of Texas. It is located halfway between Fredericksburg and Stonewall on U.S. Route 290, near the intersection of Jung Lane. The community was believed to have been settled circa 1900, and reached its peak population of 50 in 2000.

Nearby businesses are a bed-and-breakfast concern, and Wildseed Farms.
