= Robert Addison Gillespie =

- Born: June 12, 1815; Blount County, Tennessee, US
- Died: September 23, 1846 (aged 31); Monterrey, Nuevo León, Mexico
- Resting place: Odd Fellows Cemetery, San Antonio, Texas, US
- Known for: Texas Ranger; Gillespie County, Texas, named for him

Robert Addison Gillespie (1815–1846) was a business man, land speculator, and Captain in the Texas Rangers under John Coffee Hays and Zachary Taylor. Gillespie died in the Battle of Monterrey. Gillespie County, Texas, was named in his honor.

== Early life ==
Gillespie was born on June 12, 1815, in Blount County, Tennessee, one of three sons of Robert Gillespie and his wife Patsy Houston Gillespie. By the time Gillespie was twenty-two years old, he and his brothers James and Matthew were operating the Gillespie & Brothers mercantile and land speculation business in Matagorda, Texas. Within two years, the three brothers had relocated their business to La Grange.

== Texas Rangers ==
Gillespie participated in the 1840 upper Colorado River expedition with John Henry Moore of the Old Three Hundred, during the period when Moore was engaging the Comanche in battle.

From September 1842 to January 7, 1843, Gillespie held the rank of Private in a Texas Rangers company under John Coffee Hays, and participated in the 1842 Battle of Salado Creek. From June 1, 1843, to September 30, 1843, Private Gillespie was part of the Hays Spy Company. February 25, 1844, to June 26, 1844, Gillespie was still enlisted as a private in the Rangers under Hays. Gillespie served under Hays during the 1844 Battle of Walker's Creek, between Hays and Comanche chief Yellow Wolf, and suffered a lance wound during the battle. Gillespie rose to the rank of First Lieutenant for the Hays Texas Rangers roster of February 12, 1845, to September 28, 1845. On September 28, Gillespie formed the San Antonio Mounted Rangers, as part of the Hays Battalion of Texas Mounted Rangers, and served as its Captain until March 28, 1846.

During the Mexican–American War, the Rangers joined Zachary Taylor at the Battle of Monterrey. The first Ranger to breach the fort at the Independence Hill summit, Gillespie was wounded during the assault on Bishop's Palace of September 22, 1846. He succumbed to his wounds on September 23.

== Legacy ==
His body was returned to San Antonio for burial. On April 21, 1856, Gillespie's remains were interred at the Odd Fellows Cemetery.

Gillespie County, Texas, was named in honor of Captain Gillespie.
