= Albert, Texas =

- Ghost town
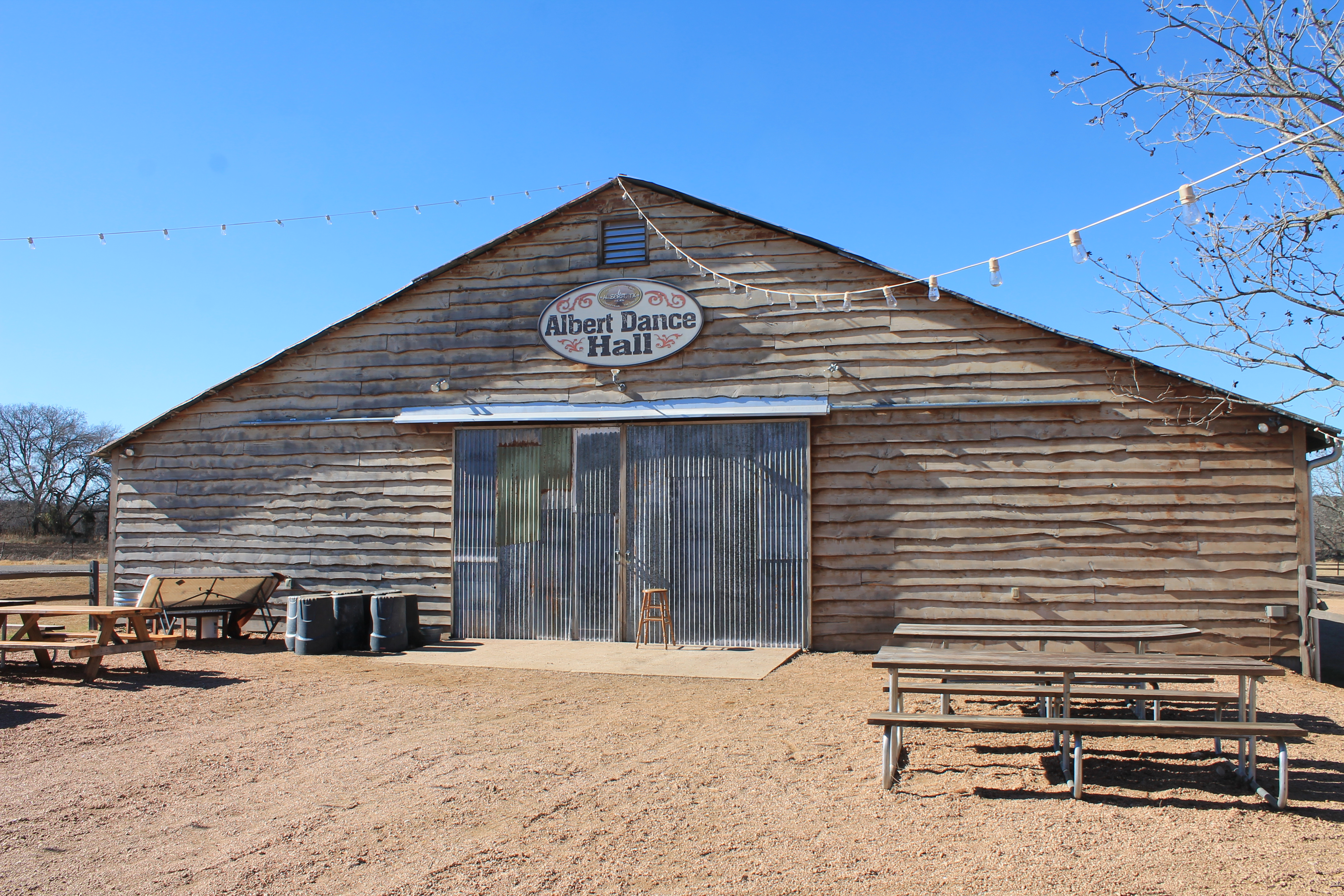
- Albert Ice House & Dance Hall

- Location within Texas Location within the United States
- Coordinates: 30°11′38″N 98°36′06″W
- Country: United States
- State: Texas
- County: Gillespie
- Elevation: 1,480 ft (450 m)

Population (2015)
  - Total: 7
- Time zone: UTC-6 (Central (CST))
  - Summer (DST): UTC-5 (CDT)
- Area code: 830
- FIPS code: 48-01660
- GNIS feature ID: 1377922

Albert, originally Martinsburg, is a ghost town located 16 miles (25.7 km) southeast of Fredericksburg and one mile (1.6 km) west of the Blanco County line in southeastern Gillespie County, Texas, United States. The town was a stop on the Fredericksburg-Blanco stage route; in 1967, it became a stop on the President's Ranch Trail.

In late October 2007, the town was put up for sale on the auction website eBay.

== Early history ==
On December 15, 1847, a petition was submitted to create Gillespie County. In 1848, the legislature formed Gillespie County from Bexar and Travis Counties. While the signers were overwhelmingly German immigrants, names also on the petition were Castillo, Pena, and Munos, and a handful of non-German Anglo names.

The first white settlers were George Cauley, Ben White, Sr., and a man named Jacobs. Around 1877, blacksmith Fritz Wilke, George Maenius, and John Petri moved from Fredericksburg seeking pasture for their cattle. Wilke bought land from a man named Elmeier, who was robbed and murdered years later.

The Martinsburg post office operated from 1877 to 1886. In 1892, Martinsburg got a new post office and a new name, after Albert Luckenbach sold his store in Luckenbach; he arrived to register a new post office in town, under the name Albert.

A school was established in 1891; in 1897, postmaster Otto Schumann opened the town's first store. In 1900, a new school building was erected; 36th President of the United States Lyndon Baines Johnson was briefly enrolled there as a boy. A local Lutheran mission, the Lutheran Church of Stonewall, was established in 1902 which Johnson attended.

== Population decline ==
Albert had 50 residents in 1925, only four in 1964, and 25 in 1972. By 1985, the store had been torn down, the school converted into a community club, and the dance hall into a storage locker; however, Albert still had 25 residents and two businesses. The population would stay at 25 through 2000; by 2007, the town had been all but abandoned.

== Since 2004 ==
In 2004, Bobby Cave, at the time an insurance broker, bought Albert—more specifically, property on Ranch Road 1623 between Stonewall and Blanco— for $216,000. Cave then built a tavern (in a style area locals call an icehouse) on the site of the town's former general store; after investing nearly half a million dollars, in 2007, he put it up for sale on eBay with a reserve price of $2.5 million. In 2009, the town was carved up and again for sale, this time with an asking price of $883,000. A parcel comprising 12.09 acres (48,900 m^{2}) of the town was purchased by the Easley family (Point Evans, LLC) from Austin, Texas; Brandon Easley was nominated by the family to be the town manager. He has made several improvements to what is currently named the Albert Ice House and Dance Hall.

== See also ==
- Williams Creek School, Gillespie County, Texas
