= Luckenbach, Texas =

- Unincorporated community
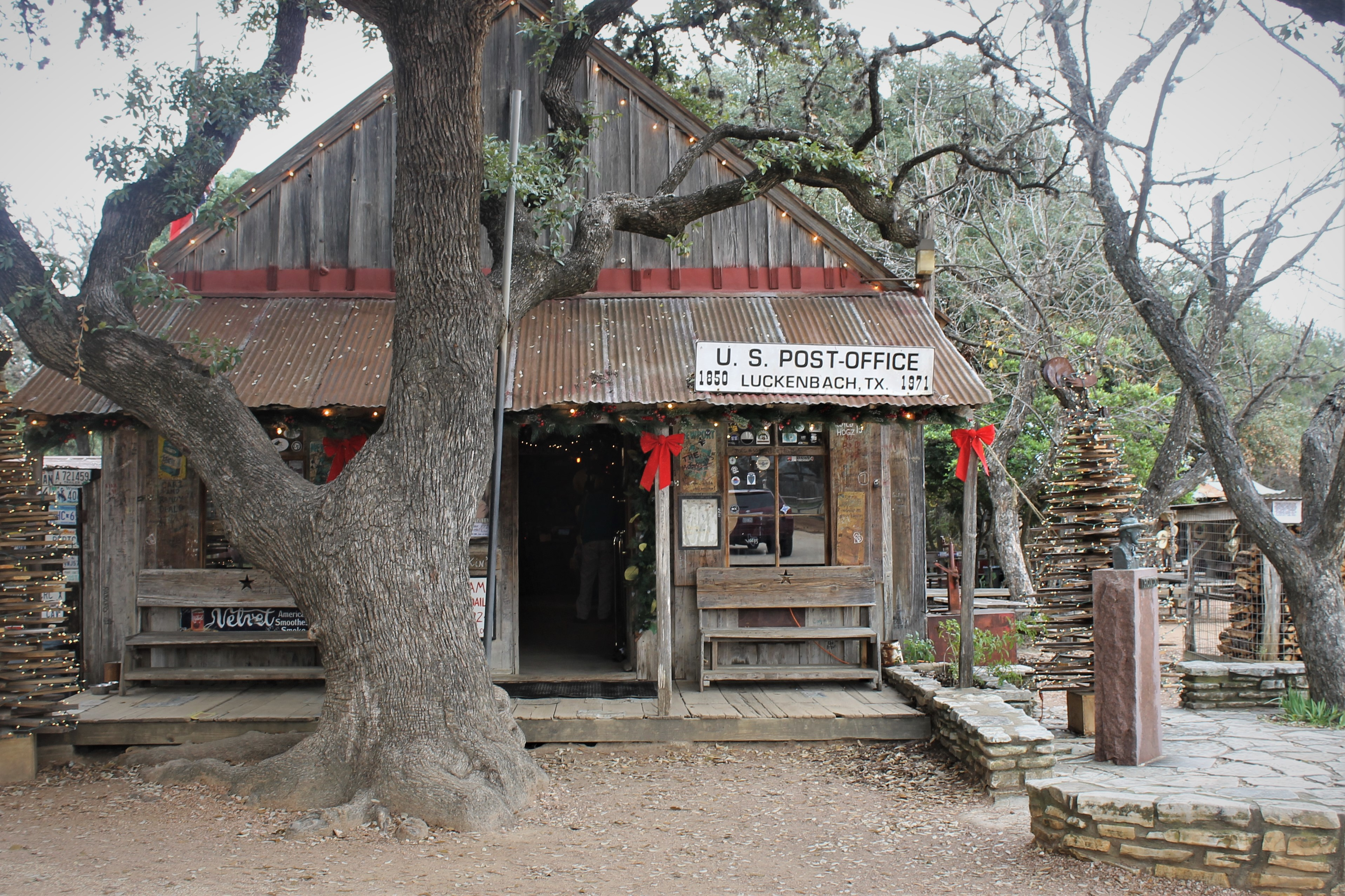
- U.S. Post Office in Luckenbach, 1850-1971
- Motto: Everybody's somebody in Luckenbach.
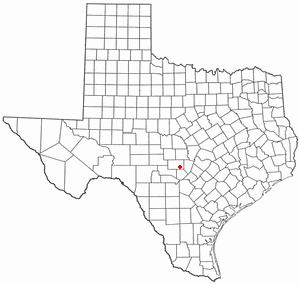
- Location within the state of Texas
- Coordinates: 30.18152°N 98.75721°W
- Country: United States
- State: Texas
- County: Gillespie
- Elevation: 1,562 ft (476 m)

Population (2021)
  - Total: 3
- Time zone: UTC-6 (CST)
  - Summer (DST): UTC-5 (CDT)
- GNIS feature ID: 1378619
- Website: http://www.luckenbachtexas.com/

Luckenbach (/ˈluːkɪnbɑːk/ LOO-kin-bahk) is an unincorporated town 13 miles (19 km) from Fredericksburg in southeastern Gillespie County, Texas, United States. Named for Carl Albert Luckenbach, son of the early settler Jacob Luckenbach, the town is known as a venue for country music and for its German-Texan heritage.

== History ==
On December 15, 1847, a petition was submitted to create Gillespie County. In 1848, the Texas Legislature formed Gillespie County from Bexar and Travis Counties. Its oldest building is a combination general store and saloon reputedly opened in 1849 (1886 is more likely, based on land improvement records of the Texas State Library and Archives Commission) by Minna Engel, whose father was an itinerant minister from Germany. The community, first named Grape Creek, was later renamed after Engel's husband, Carl Albert Luckenbach. They later moved to another town that became Albert, Texas. Luckenbach was first established as a community trading post, one of a few that never broke a peace treaty with the Comanche Indians, with whom they traded.

Luckenbach's population increased to a high of 492 in 1904, but by the 1960s it was almost a ghost town.

Citizens of the town claim a resident (Jacob Brodbeck) launched the first airplane years before the Wright Brothers.

=== Modern history ===
A newspaper advertisement offering "town — pop. 3 — for sale" led actor Guich Koock, rancher-folklorist-humorist John Russell (Hondo) Crouch (1916–1976), along with rancher Kathy Morgan, to buy Luckenbach for $30,000 in 1970.

The property has been host to many unique festivals including the Luckenbach Women's Chili Cookoff and The 1st Luckenbach World's Fair, where Willie Nelson made a surprise appearance. In the 1990s, the town was host to several of Willie Nelson's Fourth of July Picnics.

The post office was closed on April 30, 1971, and its zip code (78647) was retired. The general store remains active as a souvenir shop. The surrounding properties still identify as part of Luckenbach, Texas, today.

== Geography ==
It consists of 9.142 acres (37,000 m^{2}) between South Grape Creek (a tributary of the Pedernales River) and Snail Creek, just south of U.S. Highway 290 on the south side of Ranch to Market Road 1376. This location is roughly 50 miles (80 km) north of San Antonio and 69 miles (111 km) west of Austin. The Luckenbach website lists "412 Luckenbach Town Loop, Fredericksburg, TX 78624" as the physical address for GPS navigation.

=== Climate ===
The climate in this area is characterized by hot, humid summers and generally mild to cool winters. According to the Köppen climate classification system, Stonewall has a humid subtropical climate, Cfa on climate maps.

Climate data for Luckenbach, Texas
Month	Jan	Feb	Mar	Apr	May	Jun	Jul	Aug	Sep	Oct	Nov	Dec	Year
Mean daily maximum °F (°C)	61.0 (16.1)	64.0 (17.8)	72.0 (22.2)	79.0 (26.1)	84.0 (28.9)	92.0 (33.3)	94.0 (34.4)	95.0 (35.0)	88.0 (31.1)	80.0 (26.7)	69.0 (20.6)	62.0 (16.7)	78.3 (25.7)
Mean daily minimum °F (°C)	38.0 (3.3)	41.0 (5.0)	49.0 (9.4)	56.0 (13.3)	64.0 (17.8)	70.0 (21.1)	72.0 (22.2)	72.0 (22.2)	66.0 (18.9)	57.0 (13.9)	47.0 (8.3)	39.0 (3.9)	55.9 (13.3)
Average precipitation inches (mm)	1.5 (38)	2.0 (51)	2.7 (69)	2.1 (53)	3.7 (94)	3.9 (99)	2.8 (71)	2.0 (51)	2.8 (71)	3.1 (79)	2.4 (61)	2.1 (53)	31.1 (790)
Average precipitation days	4	4	4	3	5	4	3	3	4	4	4	4	46
Source: NOAA

== Notable person ==
- Lt. Colonel Alfred P.C. Petsch—(1887–1981) Lawyer, legislator, civic leader, and philanthropist born in Luckenbach. Served in the Texas House of Representatives, World War I, and World War II.

== Guinness world record ==
"Pickin' for the Record" was a fundraiser held in Luckenbach on August 23, 2009, for the organization Voices of a Grateful Nation. The Guinness world record was broken for the most guitar players gathered at one time to play continuously for at least five minutes. The Luckenbach record broke the standing German record by 50, with the official count at 1,868.

== Visiting ==
Luckenbach hosts live music events each weekend. On Sundays, it is common for visitors to bring instruments and take turns performing informally with others in the crowd. Occasionally, local and regional celebrities drop by. There are recreational vehicle camping spots nearby, along with a small creek. Areas are also set up for washer pitching.

== Popular culture ==
- The town is the topic of the song "Luckenbach, Texas (Back to the Basics of Love)" written by Chips Moman and Bobby Emmons and recorded by Waylon Jennings. Although Jennings neither favored the song nor had he ever traveled to Luckenbach, he recorded it nonetheless; it became a #1 country hit and even made it to #25 on the pop charts, making it one of his biggest hits.
- The country band, Midland references the town in their song "She's a Cowgirl", from their soundtrack album The Sonic Ranch.
- The horror film The Naked Witch was filmed in Luckenbach in 1960. It was directed by Larry Buchanan.
- Glam metal band Warrant, with lead singer Jani Lane, mentions Luckenbach in the song "Love in Stereo" from the 1990 album Cherry Pie: "Fresh out of Luckenbach, Texas, I didn't expect that pair."
- Luckenbach was the setting for the short lived sitcom Lewis and Clark, which co-starred town owner Guich Koock and Gabe Kaplan.
- Jerry Jeff Walker recorded his live album ¡Viva Terlingua! in Luckenbach in August, 1973.
- Pat Green references Luckenbach in many of his songs and performs a yearly Fourth of July concert in Luckenbach.
- Miranda Lambert referenced the town in the song "Looking Back On Luckenbach" from her 2024 album "Postcards From Texas".

== See also ==
- Luckenbach School
