= Doss Consolidated Common School District =

School district in Texas

Address
- 11431 Ranch Road 648 Doss, TX, 78618; United States

District information
- Grades: KG–7
- Schools: 1
- NCES District ID: 4817400

Students and staff
- Students: 21 (2023–2024)
- Teachers: 2.96 (on an FTE basis)
- Student–teacher ratio: 7.09:1

Other information
- Website: dossccsd.org

Doss Consolidated Common School District is a public school district based in the community of Doss, Texas (USA).

It has a single school, The Doss School, which began its existence in 1884.

Located in Gillespie County, a small portion of the district extends into Mason County.

In 2009, the school district was rated "exemplary" by the Texas Education Agency.
