= Tivydale, Texas =

- Unincorporated community
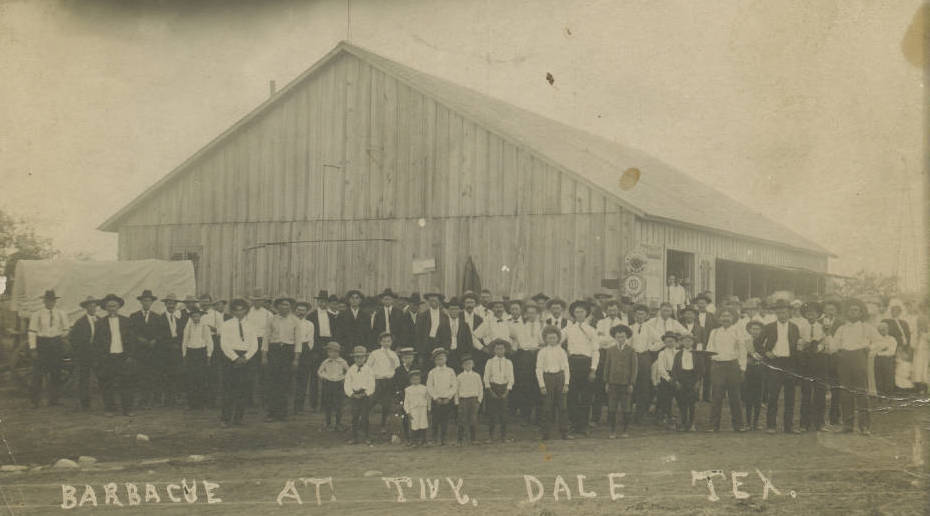
- Barbecue at Tivydale

- Location within the state of Texas Tivydale (the United States)
- Coordinates: 30°15′03″N 99°05′58″W
- Country: United States
- State: Texas
- County: Gillespie
- Elevation: 1,860 ft (567 m)
- Time zone: UTC-6 (Central (CST))
  - Summer (DST): UTC-5 (CDT)
- Area code: 830
- FIPS code: 48-73160
- GNIS feature ID: 1379166

Tivydale is an unincorporated farming and ranching community located in Gillespie County, Texas, United States, located 14 miles (23 km) west of Fredericksburg, and was originally known as Bunkesville and Pumpkinville.

== Establishment ==
On December 15, 1847, a petition was submitted to create Gillespie County. In 1848, the legislature formed Gillespie County from Bexar and Travis counties. While the signers were overwhelmingly German immigrants, names also on the petition were Castillo, Pena, Munos, and a handful of non-German Anglo names.

Tivydale is named for Joseph Albert Tivy. Born in Canada, and later served as a Texas Ranger, Tivy was an adventurer and entrepreneur. He joined the California Gold Rush, fought in the Civil War, served in legislatures both in California and in Texas, and later became mayor of Kerrville.

Tivy had bought several thousand acres of land in 1847 and 1848 in Gillespie County. Between 1877 and 1885, he sold land in the Pedernales River valley. Capt. Joseph Tivy died in 1892 and is buried on Tivy Mountain on the edge of Kerrville with his wife, one sister and his wife's cat.

The German-music Bunkesville Band was a popular area entertainment.

== Schützenfest ==
Tivydale has an active schützenbund (shooting club) and participates in the annual Gillespie County Bundes Schutzenfest. The event includes crowning of one or more Schützenkönigs (shooting kings), a parade and a Saengerfest, or music festival.

== Additional sourcing ==
- "Land Grant Search". Texas General Land Office. Archived from the original on February 20, 2011.
