= Zion Lutheran Church (Fredericksburg, Texas) =

Coordinates: 30°16′45″N 98°52′40″W

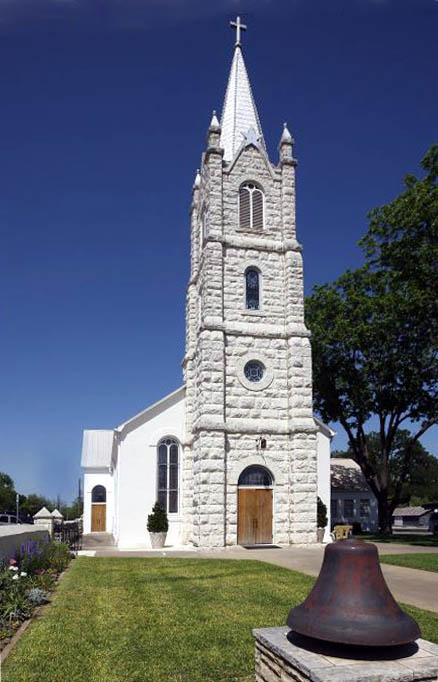
- Zion Lutheran Church
- Location: 424 W. Main Street; Fredericksburg, Texas
- Country: United States
- Denomination: Lutheran
- Website: Zion Lutheran Church Fredericksburg Texas

History
- Founded: 1852

Specifications
- Materials: Native Limestone

Zion Lutheran Church is located in Fredericksburg, in Gillespie County, in the U.S. state of Texas. It is the oldest Lutheran Church in the Texas Hill Country and one of the oldest in Texas. The church was built by six families in 1852. On January 13, 1853, twelve founders signed its articles of organization. The cornerstones for the church were set on March 6, 1854. Designated a Recorded Texas Historic Landmark in 1964, Marker number 10132.

== Architecture ==
Members of the young congregation provided most of the building materials as well as the labor. In 1884, improvements were made to the building. On June 12, 1908, an enlarged sanctuary was dedicated. Additions to the original 1853 structure included the bell tower and a new chancel. The cruciform and the baptistry were designed by Adolph Wehmeyer. The church contains a Thordwalsen statue of Jesus Christ, which dominates the chancel, having also been unveiled in 1908. In 1953, under pastor G.W. Sager, an annex for Sunday school and a fellowship hall were constructed adjacent to the sanctuary. The church was most recently renovated in 1959, with the adding of air conditioning, lowering and enlarging the balcony, the installation of new pews, the replacement of the stained glass windows, and the rebuilding and enlargement of the pipe organ. In 1963, the church installed three bronze bells to call people to worship, having replaced the previous single cast iron bell.

=== Windows ===
A video was created in the spring of 2022 documenting the stained glass windows that adorn the church. This video is available on the Zion web site.

The nave windows of Zion Lutheran Church have special meanings:

- The Advent Window commemorates the arrival of Christ in Jerusalem on Palm Sunday.
- The Christmas Window marks the humanity of Christ and his humble birth on earth.
- The Holy Week Window portrays the institution of communion.
- The Easter Window reveals new life through the resurrection of Christ.
- The Pentecost Window connotes the spread of the Gospel.
- The Trinity Window marks the concept of God in three persons—Father, Son, and Holy Ghost.
- The Protestant Reformation Window depicts Castle Church at Wittenberg, Germany, where on October 31, 1517, Martin Luther nailed the 95 Theses challenging certain Catholic practices.

=== Symbols ===
A video was created in January 2023 documenting the symbols that adorn the church and is available on the Zion web site. . This is the script for the video.

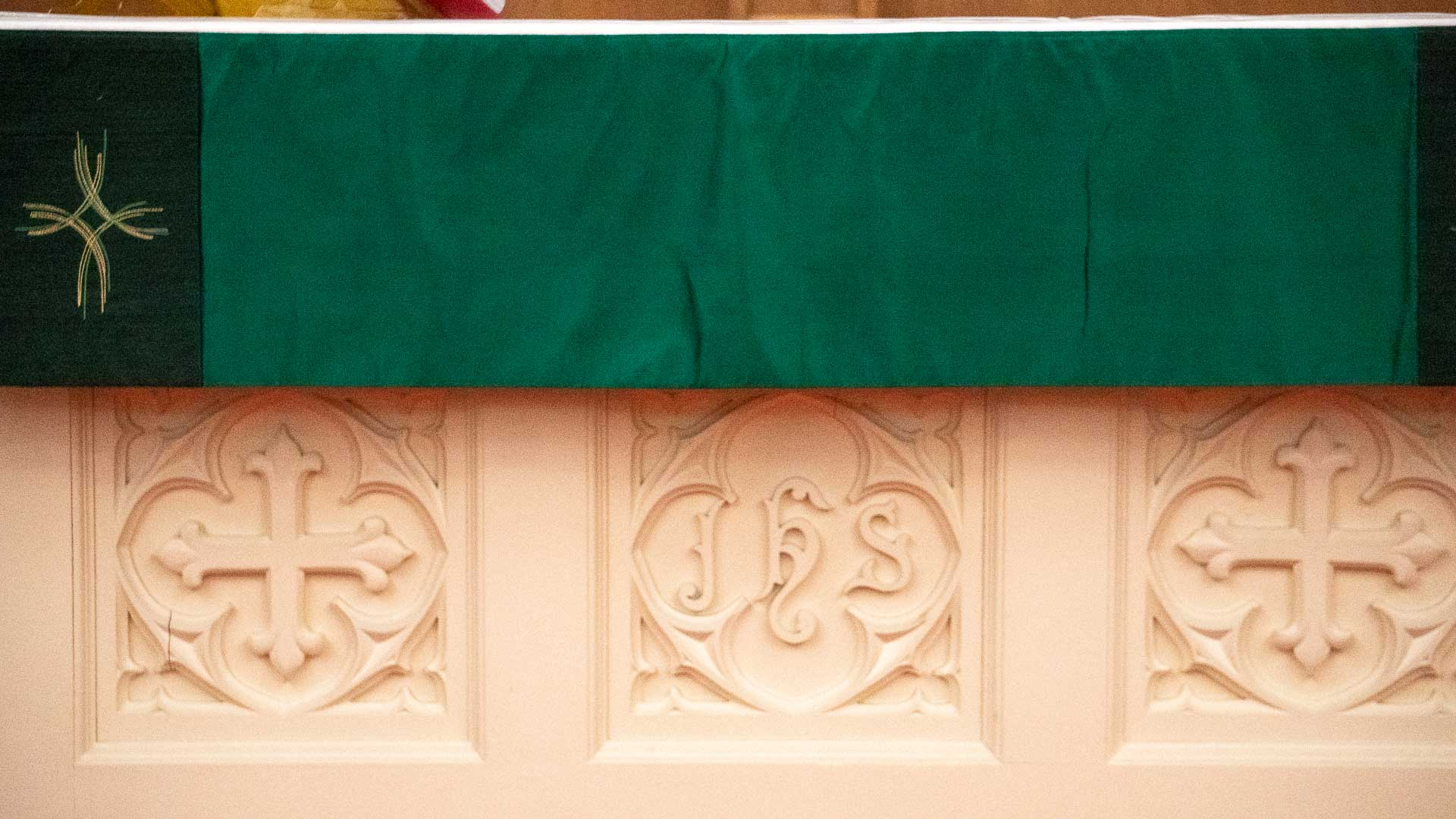
Altar

Upon entering the church, the altar draws your attention first, for it represents the bestowing of God’s Grace on His people. The altar base, in the form of a tomb, symbolizes Christ’s death. The empty cross, without crucifix, represents His power over death and His gift of salvation.

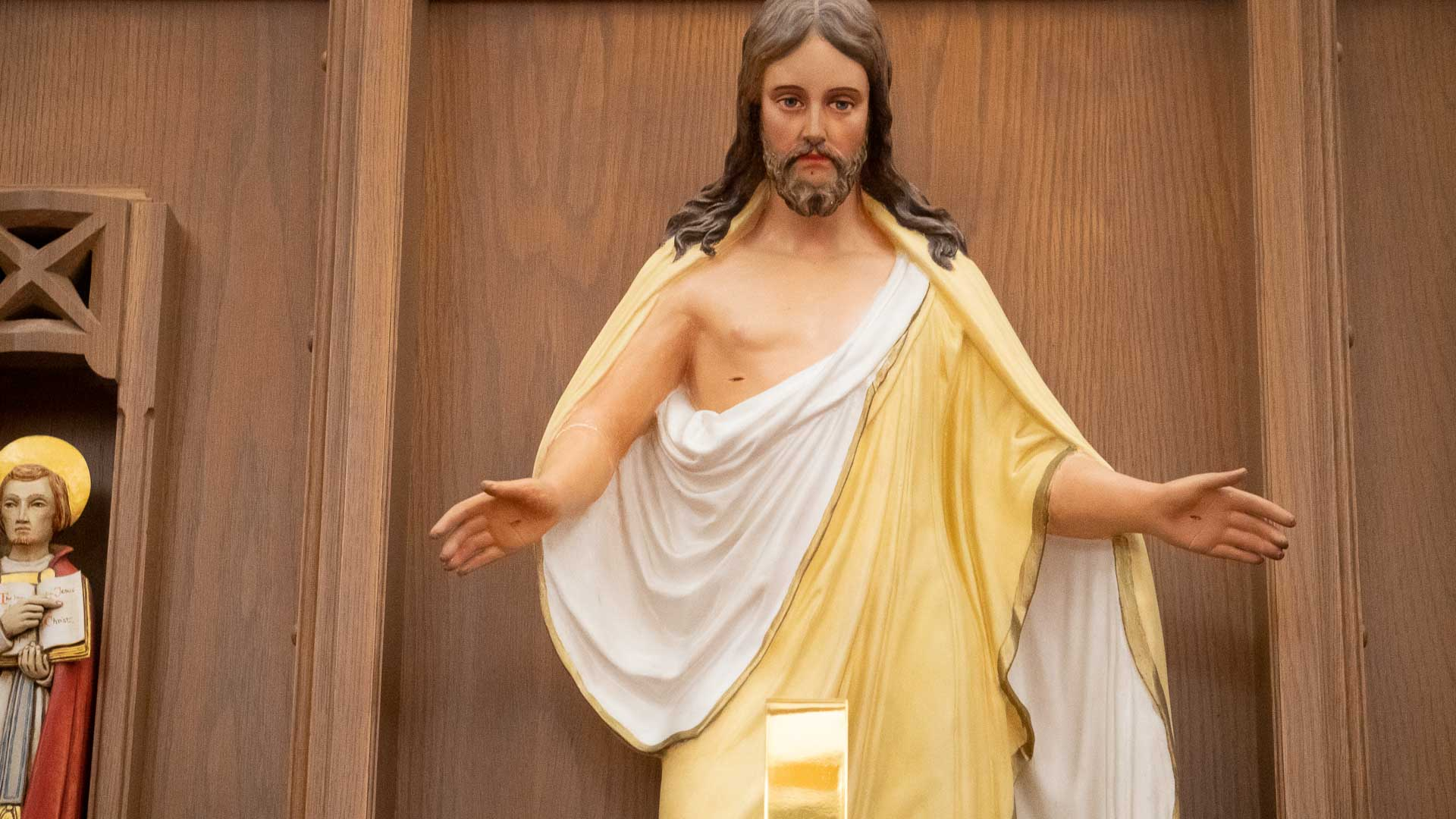
Christus statue

The esteemed Danish sculptor Bertel Thorvaldsen’s “Christus” takes the position of honor in the reredos. Thorvaldsen’s Christ shows a young man whose idealized body is draped in a heavy cloth that leaves part of his torso and right arm bare. His arms are outstretched in a gesture of welcome, embodying the Christian biblical quote, "Come to me all you who labor and are heavily burdened, and I will give you rest" (Matthew (11:28).

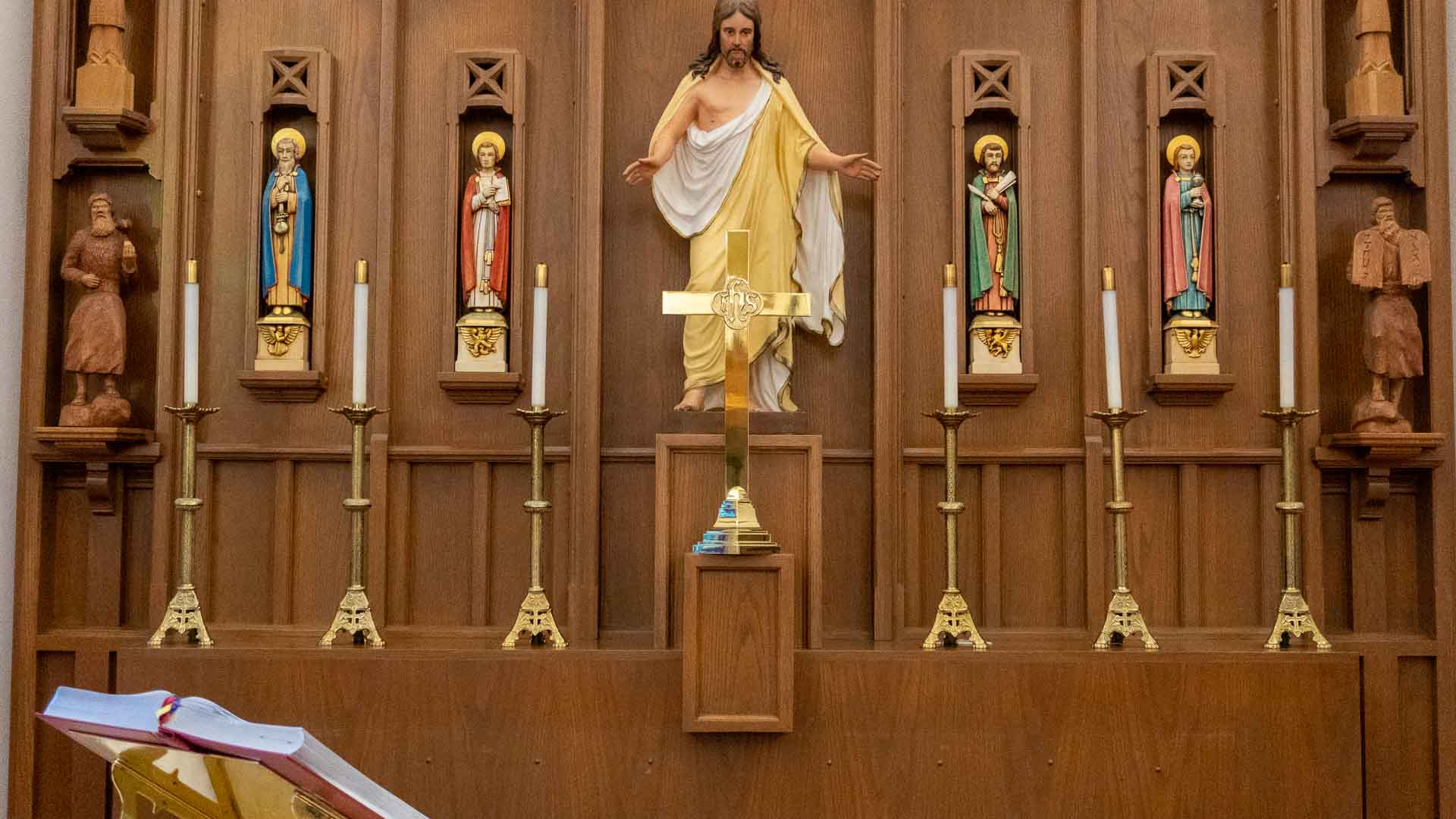
Reredos

Christ’s statue is accompanied by the colorful carved figures of the Four Evangelists, from left to right, Matthew, Mark, Luke, and John. Appropriate winged emblems appear at the feet of each Evangelist.

- The Man symbol at the feet of Matthew signifies the human nature of Christ,
- The Lion symbol at the feet of Mark, represents his royal nature,
- The Ox symbol at the feet of Luke is the emblem of sacrifice
- The Eagle symbol at the feet of John represents the grace of the Holy Spirit.

The two adoring angels at the top of the reredos, on either side, recall the Ascension. Just beneath each angel, are the carvings of Moses and Elijah, who appeared with Christ at the Transfiguration. While the statues of Moses and Elijah were done by a local artist, the Evangelist statues came from Italy, and the adoring angels from Spain.

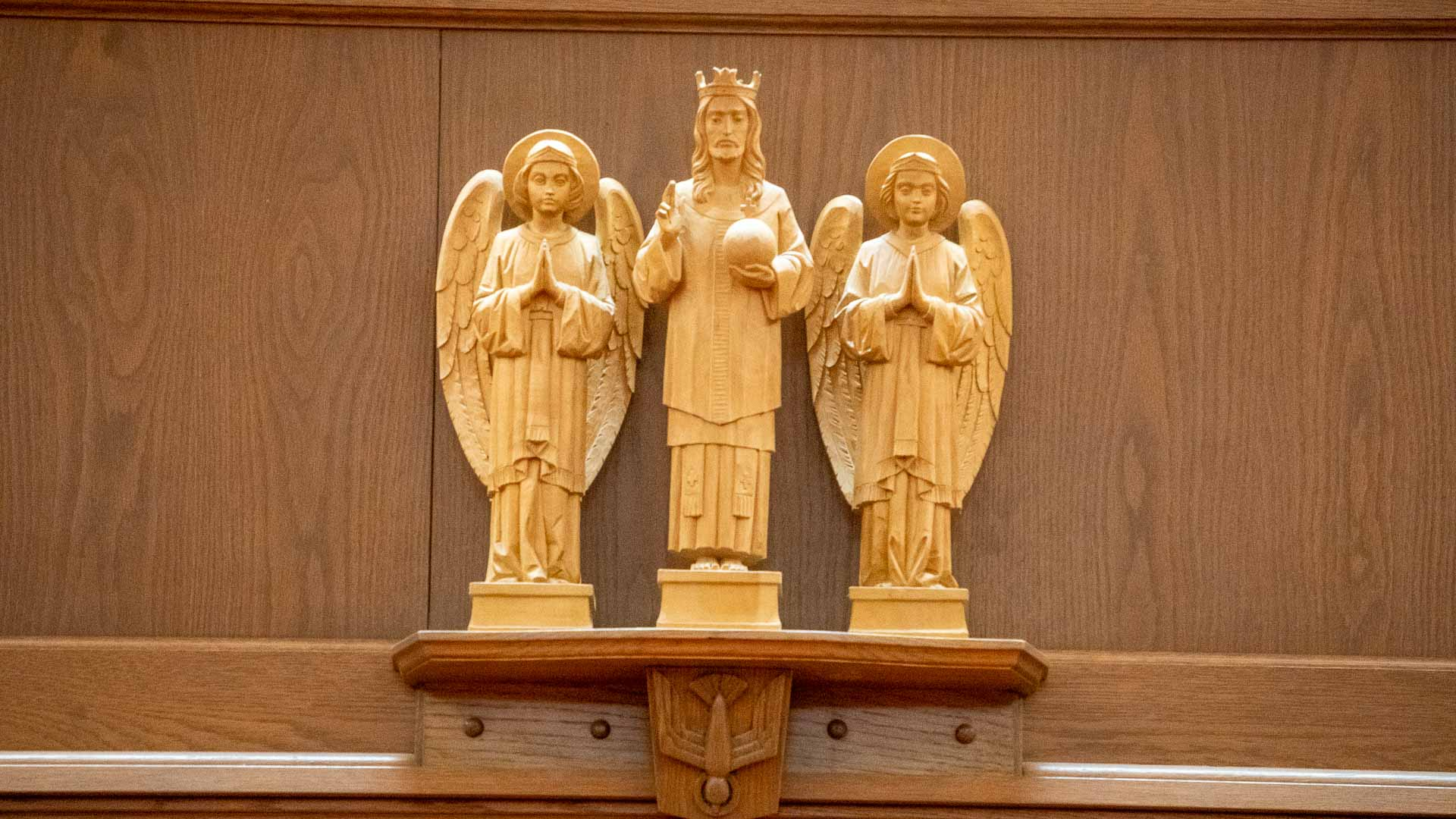
Choir loft symbols

To complete our description of the statues we need to turn to the choir loft parapet where we find between two angels, and the statue of Christ Blessing, with a descending dove at His feet. This carving came from Oberammergau, Germany. So, let’s now examine each of the shields and symbols on the trusses. We begin with the four in the chancel, the altar area. They represent the four main events in the life of Christ. From left to right: Nativity, Passion, Resurrection and Ascension.

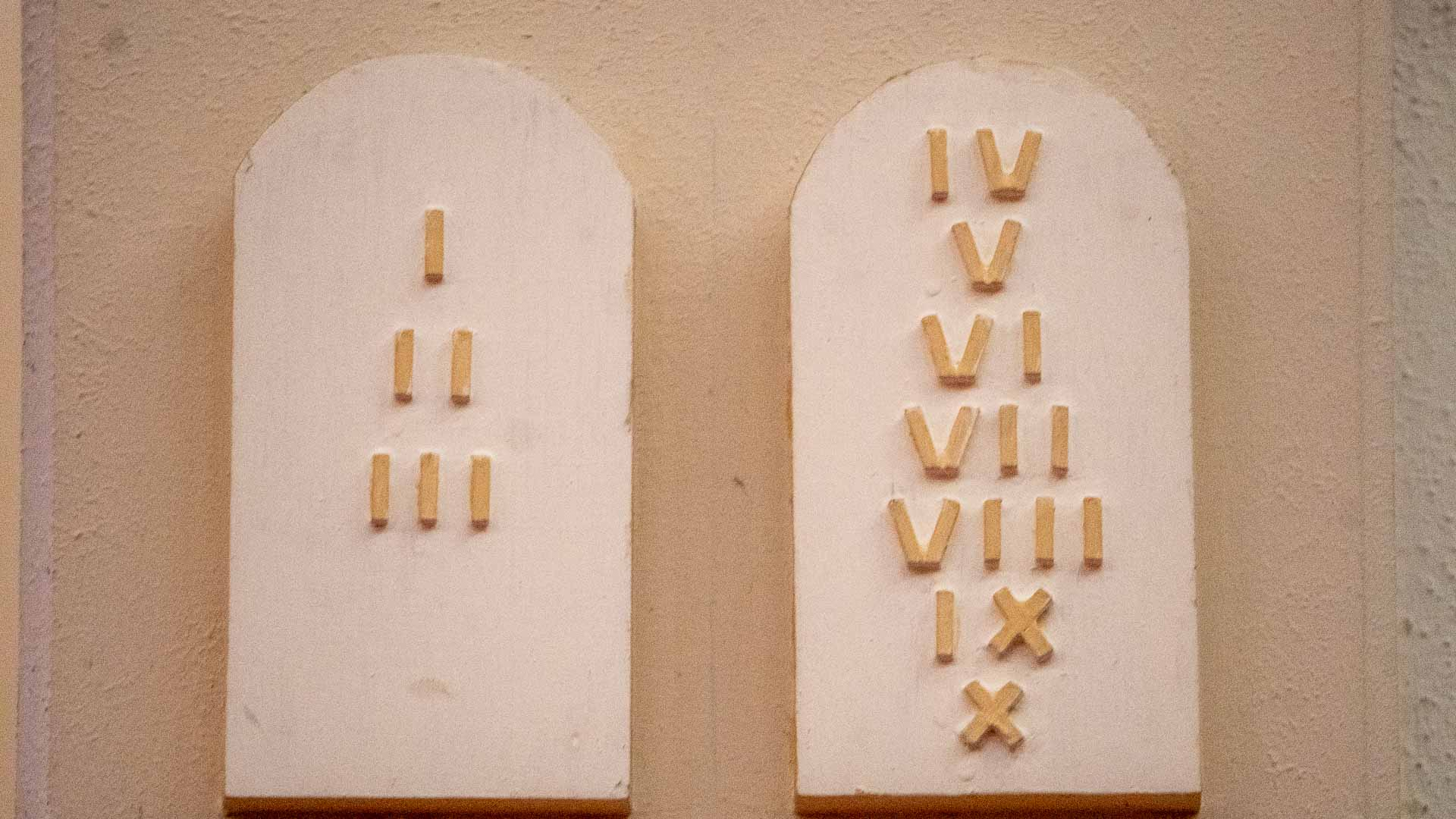
10 Commandments

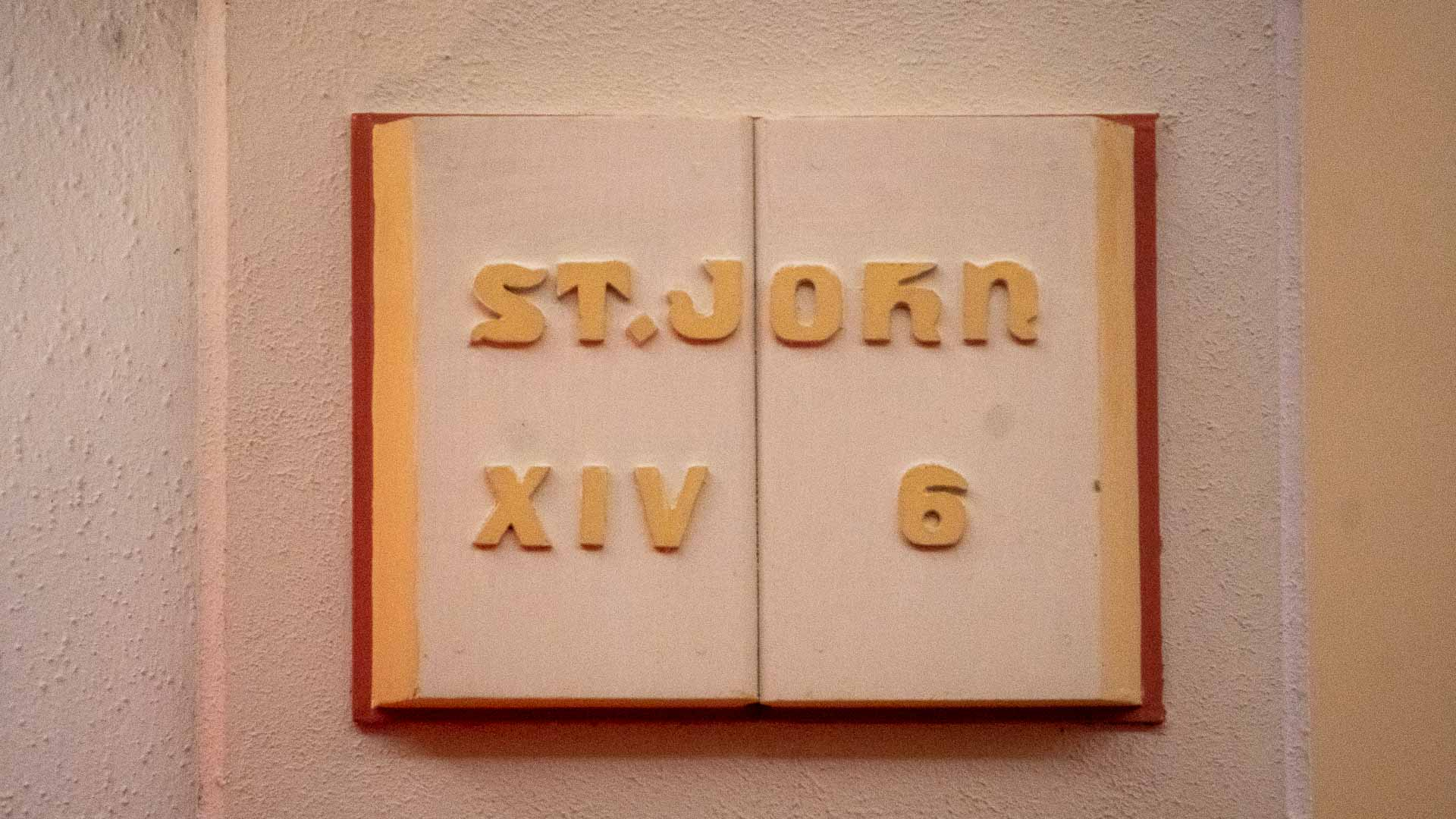
John 14:6

On the two corbels or supports for the sanctuary arch appear the Ten Commandments, to the left, representing the law of God; and the Open Bible on the right displaying John 14:6 in which Jesus says “I am the Way, the Truth and The Life.”

Follow us now as we visit the carvings located on each of the trusses within the nave or main body of the church. Each truss shield bears the symbol of one of the twelve apostles. The Chi Rho symbol, the abbreviation of Christ, is used to indicate the disciples’ martyrdom, and is incorporated in each, except the one for St. John who was believed to be the only apostle to have died a natural death.

The first shield we will examine is found as you first enter the nave looking up at the trusses on the left side. We will then work our way forward from the choir loft towards the pulpit area. The first shield depicts Two Keys and represents Simon Peter, Andrew's Brother, called Peter by Jesus of Nazareth. Traditionally, St. Peter is represented holding Two Keys of equal size, which is explained by the Savior in the Gospel of Matthew: “And I will give unto thee the keys of the kingdom of heaven: and whatsoever thou shalt bind on earth shall be bound in heaven: and whatsoever thou shalt loose on earth shall be loosed in heaven” (Matthew 16:19).

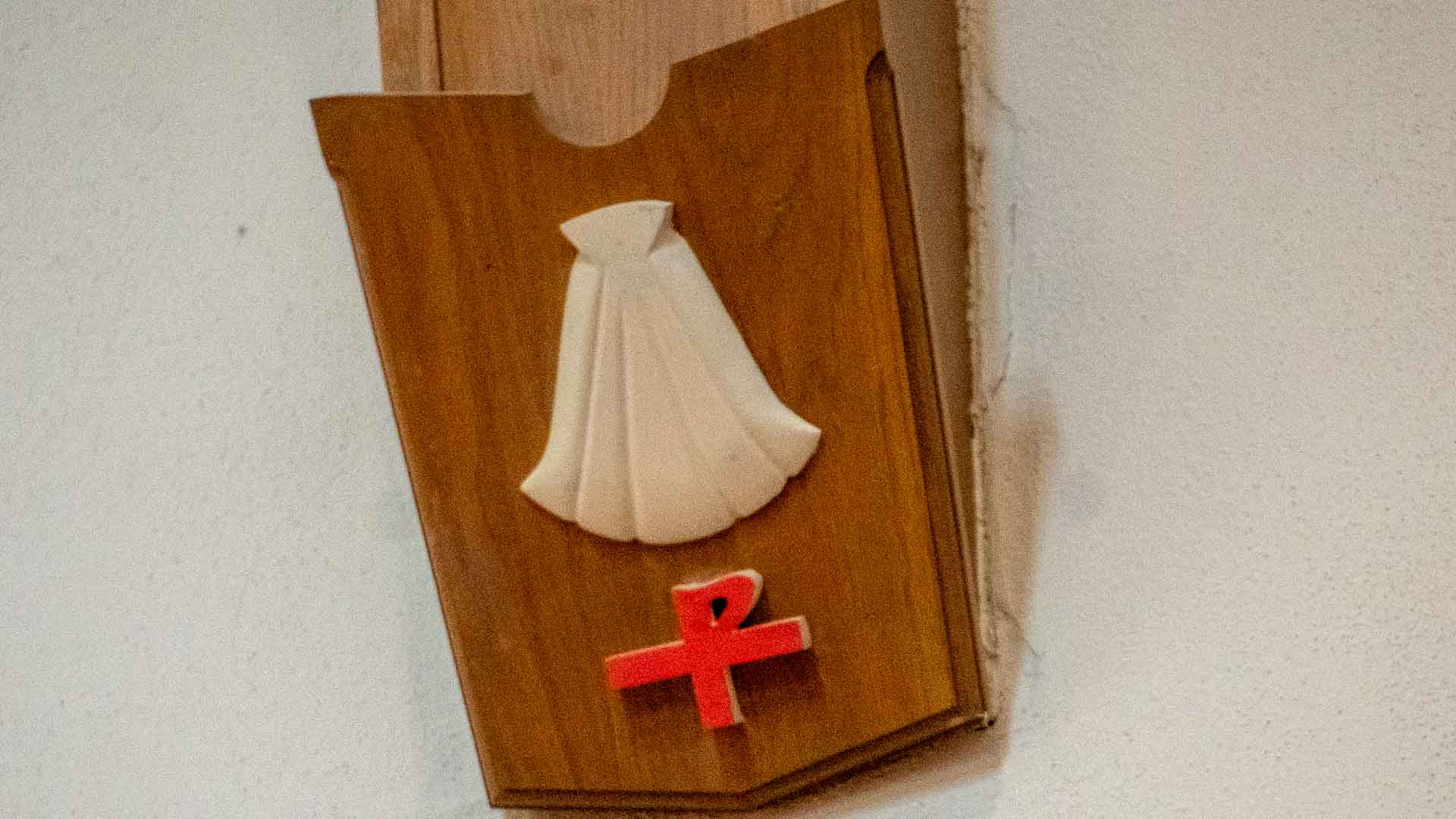
James the Greater

The next shield depicts a Shell and represents James the Greater, John's Brother, son of Zebedee; He is “the Greater” because he was called to the apostolate earlier than St. James the Less, the “Brother of Jesus”. The legend surrounding the use of this Shell as symbolic of St. James claims that after St. James’ death, his disciples shipped his body to the Iberian Peninsula to be buried in what is now Santiago. Off the coast of Spain, a heavy storm hit the ship, and the body was lost to the ocean. After some time, however, the body washed ashore undamaged, covered in scallops.

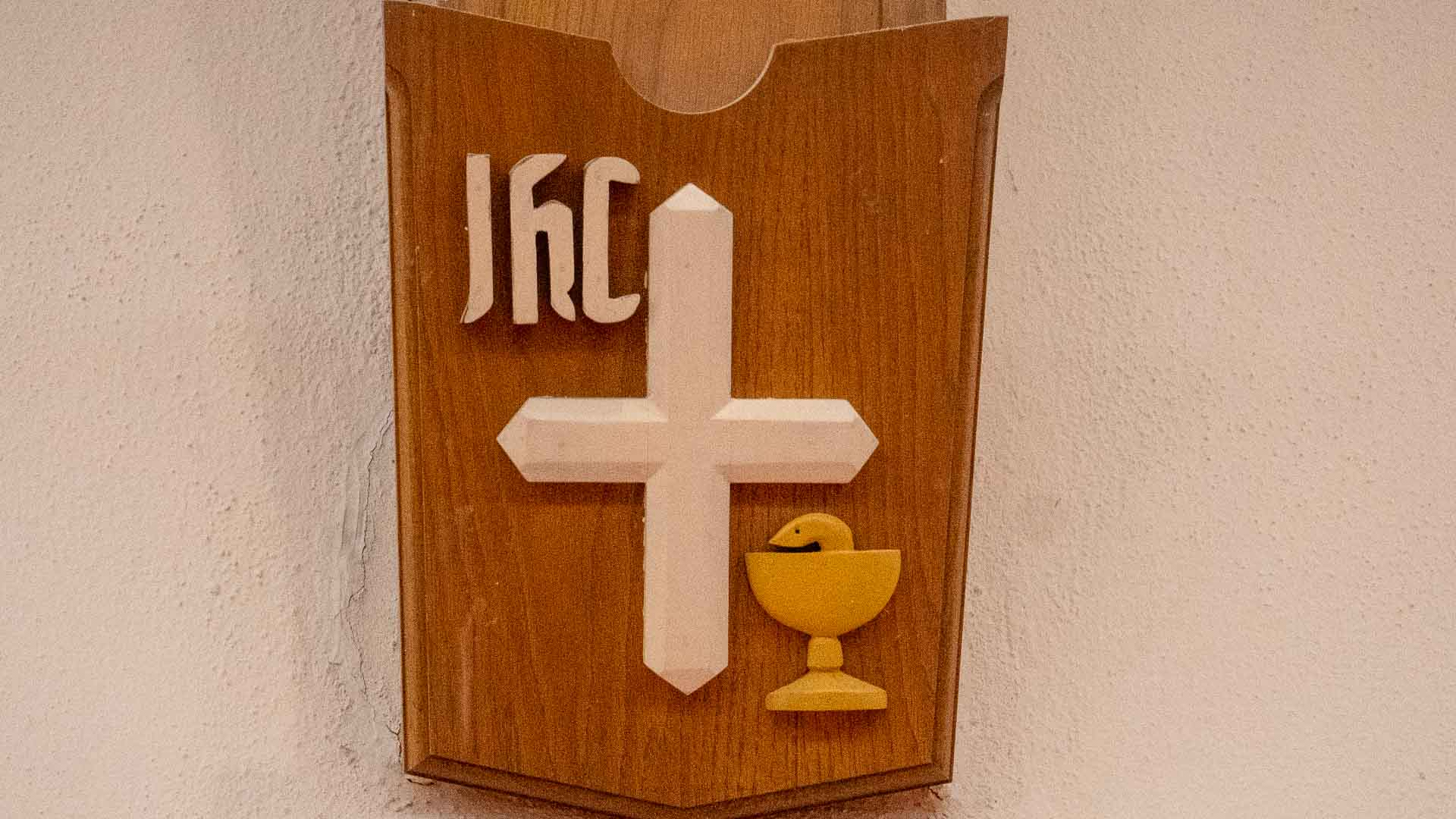
John

Proceeding along the left side still we find the third shield depicting a Passion Cross and Serpent with Chalice. This shield represents John, James' Brother, son of Zebedee; traditional sources claim that John was the only apostle to live a long life and die of natural causes. The use of the passion cross represents the fact that St. John was an eyewitness of the glory of God in the face of Christ upon the cross of Golgotha; the only apostle to boldly go to Jesus’ trial and also the only apostle who stood at the cross with Jesus while he died. The use of the serpent with chalice is explained by an old legend that once St. John was given a cup of wine which had been poisoned, but that, by his blessing, the poison came out of it in the form of a snake and St. John drank the cup unharmed.

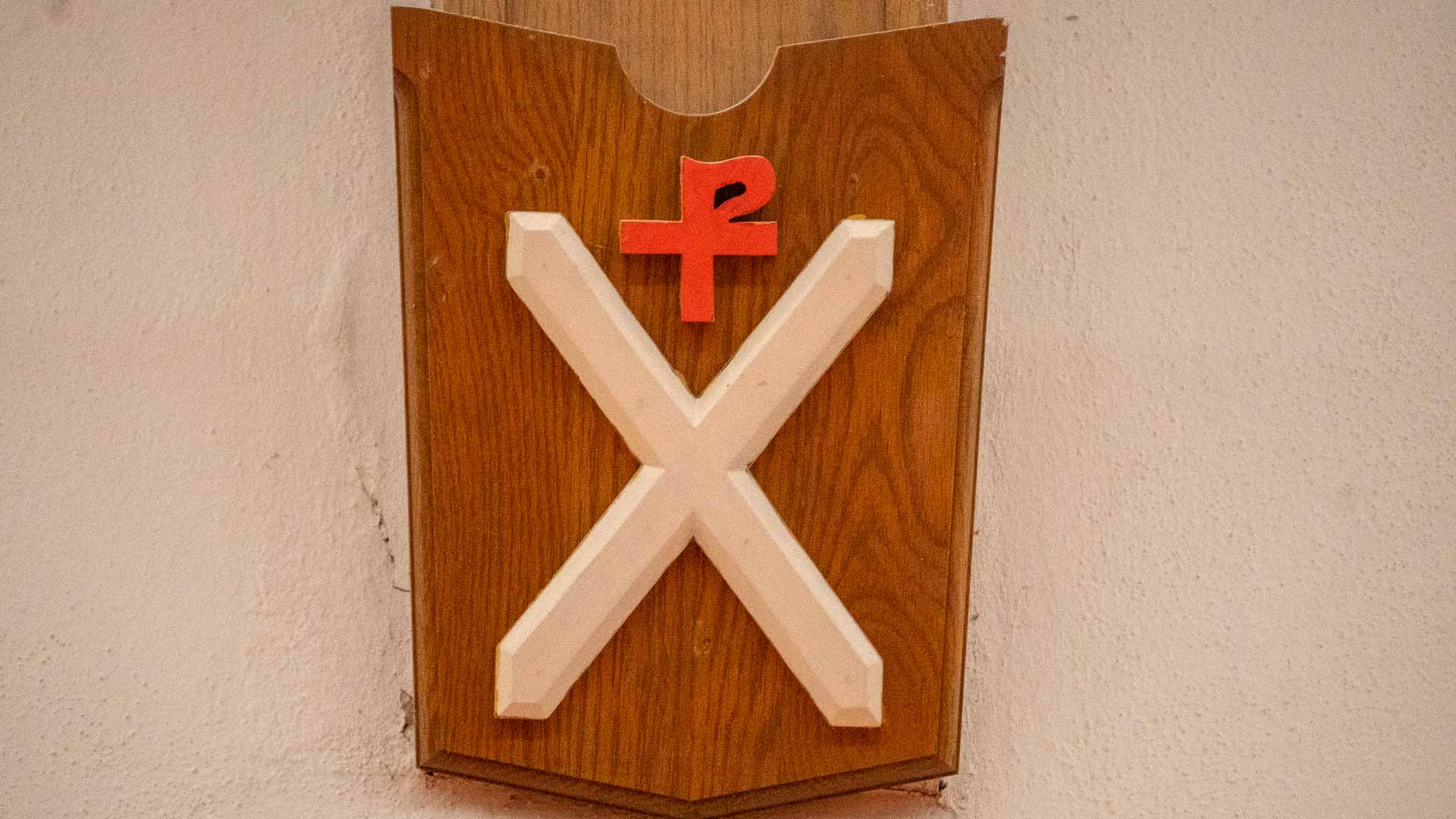
Andrew

The fourth shield we come to depicts an X-cross representing Andrew, Simon Peter’s Brother and disciple of John the Baptist. Andrew became a disciple of Christ before any of the other apostles. According to Tradition, St. Andrew was martyred by crucifixion on an X-shaped cross. Tradition has it that, like his brother St. Peter, he did not consider himself worthy to die in the same manner as His Master, and therefore specifically requested a cross of a different shape.

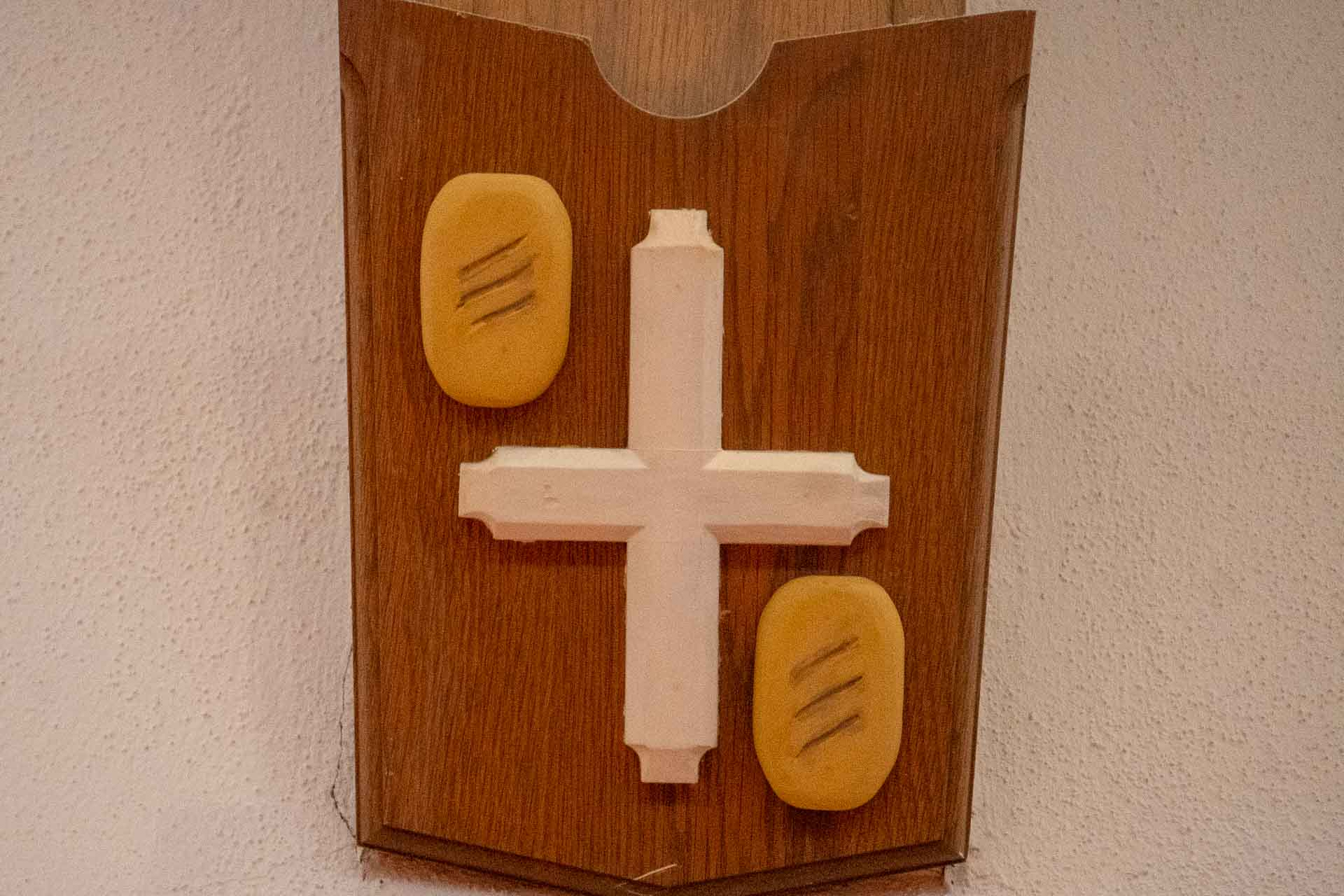
Phillip

Our next shield depicts a Cross and Two Loaves which represents Philip, from Bethsaida of Galilee. He preached in Greece, Syria, and Phrygia. Traditional symbols assigned to St. Philip include: the cross with the two loaves because of his answer to the Lord in John 6:7. St. Philip was present at the feeding of the five thousand. To test him, Jesus asked St. Philip, "Where are we to buy bread for these people to eat?" St. Philip replied, "Two hundred denarii would not buy enough bread for each of them to get a little". Yet Jesus did not rebuke him for his lack of faith.

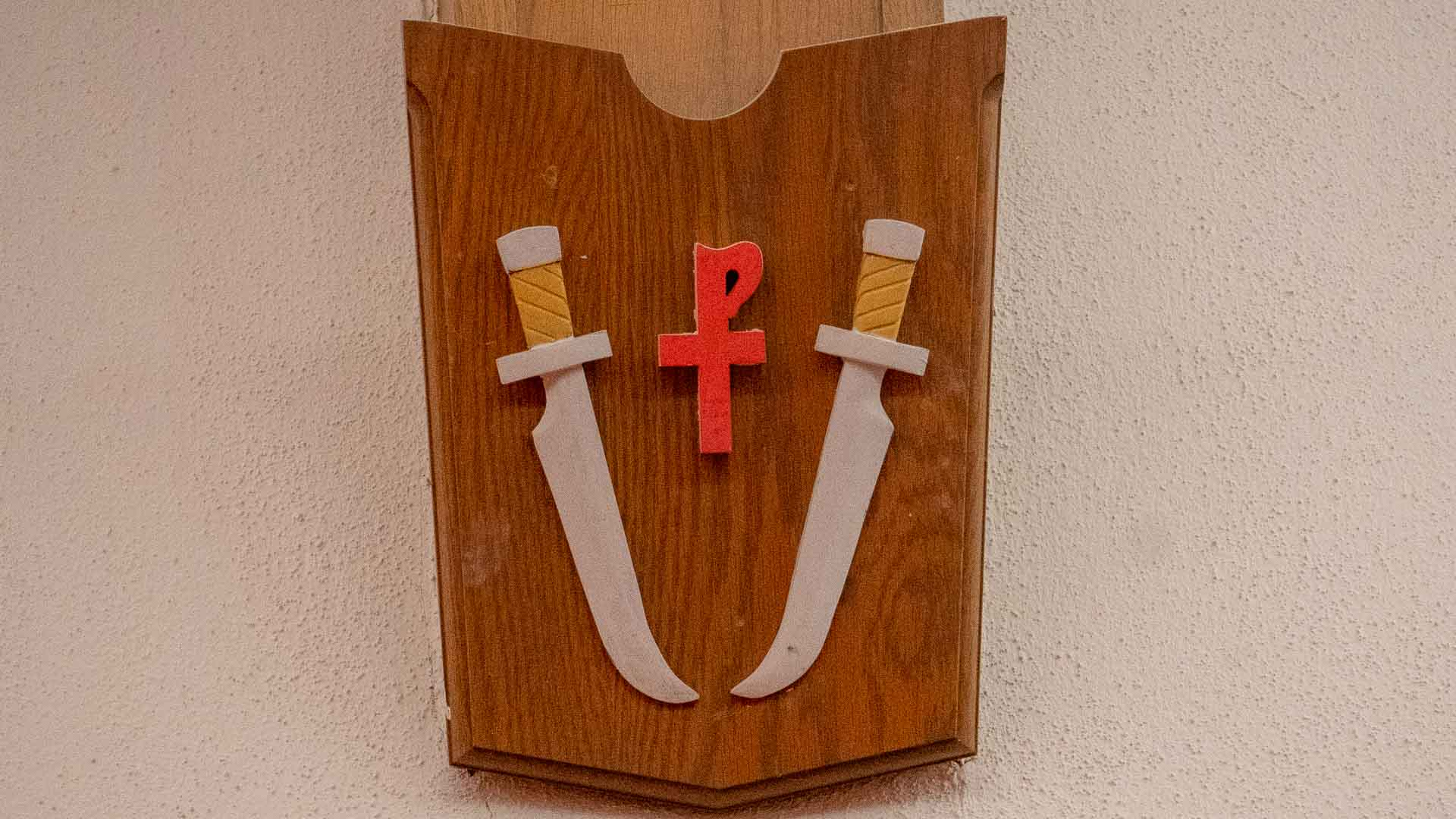
Bartholomew

The sixth and final shield on the left side of the nave depicts Flaying Knives; representing Bartholomew. He preached the Gospel of Christ in India and then went to Armenia. The flaying knives represent the manner of St. Bartholomew's death; he was flayed alive by barbarians in Armenia.

We now switch over to the right side of the nave and work our way from the baptistry and proceed towards the choir loft.

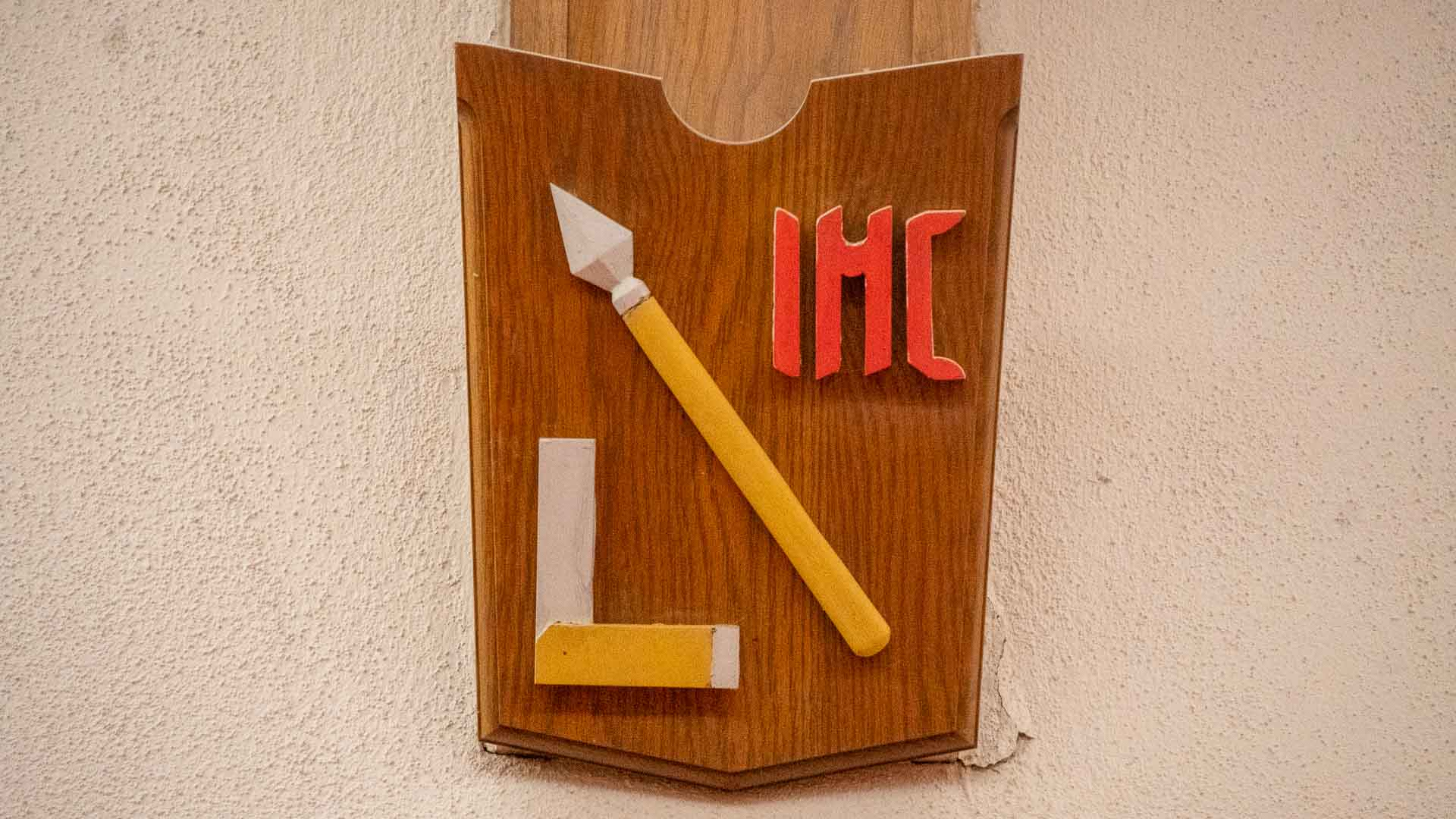
Thomas

The first shield we encounter on the right, our seventh shield, is one depicting a Spear and Square. This shield represents Thomas, who was one of the first to acknowledge the Lord’s divinity with his exclamation, “My Lord and my God!” when Jesus appeared to the disciples after his resurrection (John 20:28). Thomas stood out among all the disciples during Jesus’ short ministry because of his doubts. The carpenter's square stands for the church, St. Thomas is said to have built with his own hands in India; the spear or lance is a sign of the purported manner of his death.

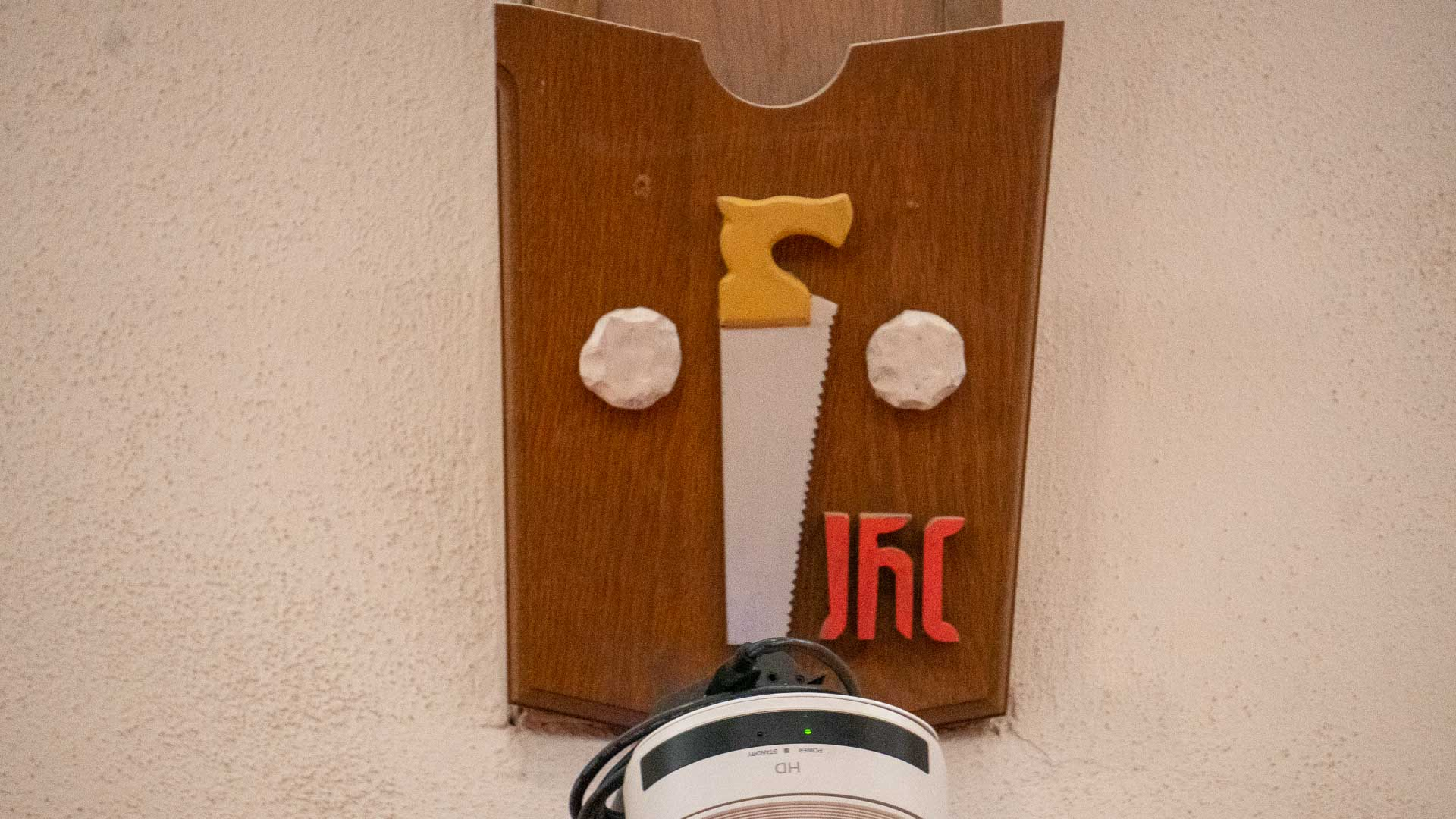
James the Less

The eighth shield, as we continue on the right side, depicts a Saw and Stones representing James the Less, the “Brother of Jesus” who led the Christians of Jerusalem until that city’s destruction in 70 AD. He wrote the Epistle of James, preached in Palestine and Egypt. Legend has it that St. James the Less suffered a terrible martyrdom by being stoned to death and his body was sawn apart, hence the stones and saw on his emblem.

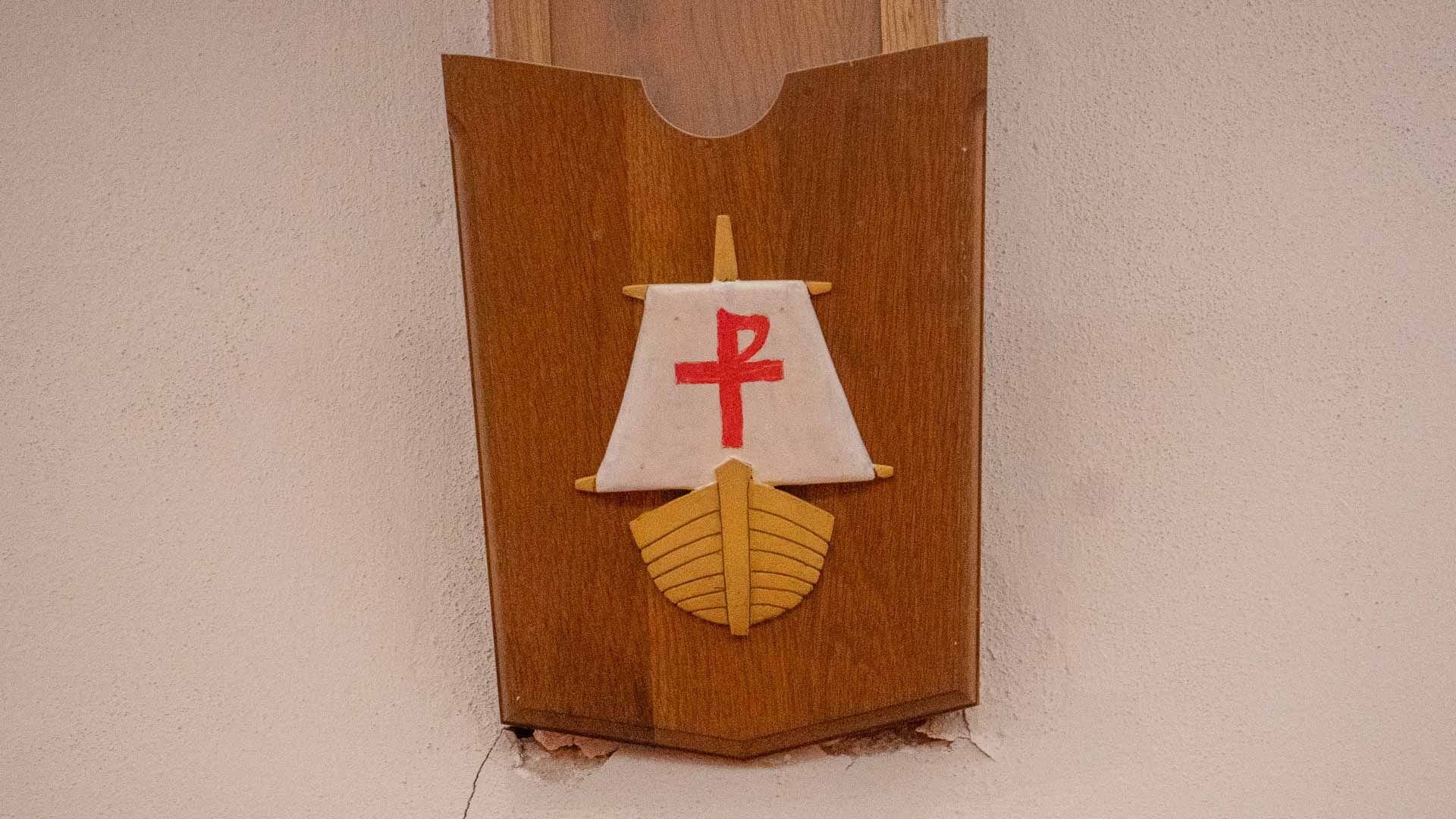
James the Less

Our ninth shield depicts a Boat. This represents Jude, who was the brother of the apostle St. James the Less. Both were related to Jesus as distant cousins. St. Jude has been credited as the author of the brief Epistle of St. Jude found in the New Testament. The boat is the symbol most often associated with St. Jude alludes to Jude's earlier life, and to Jude's voyages in his part in the mission of founding the early church. A ship is also a well-known symbol of the Christian Church. It was also a great symbol during times when Christians needed to disguise the cross, since the ship's mast forms a cross in many of its depictions.

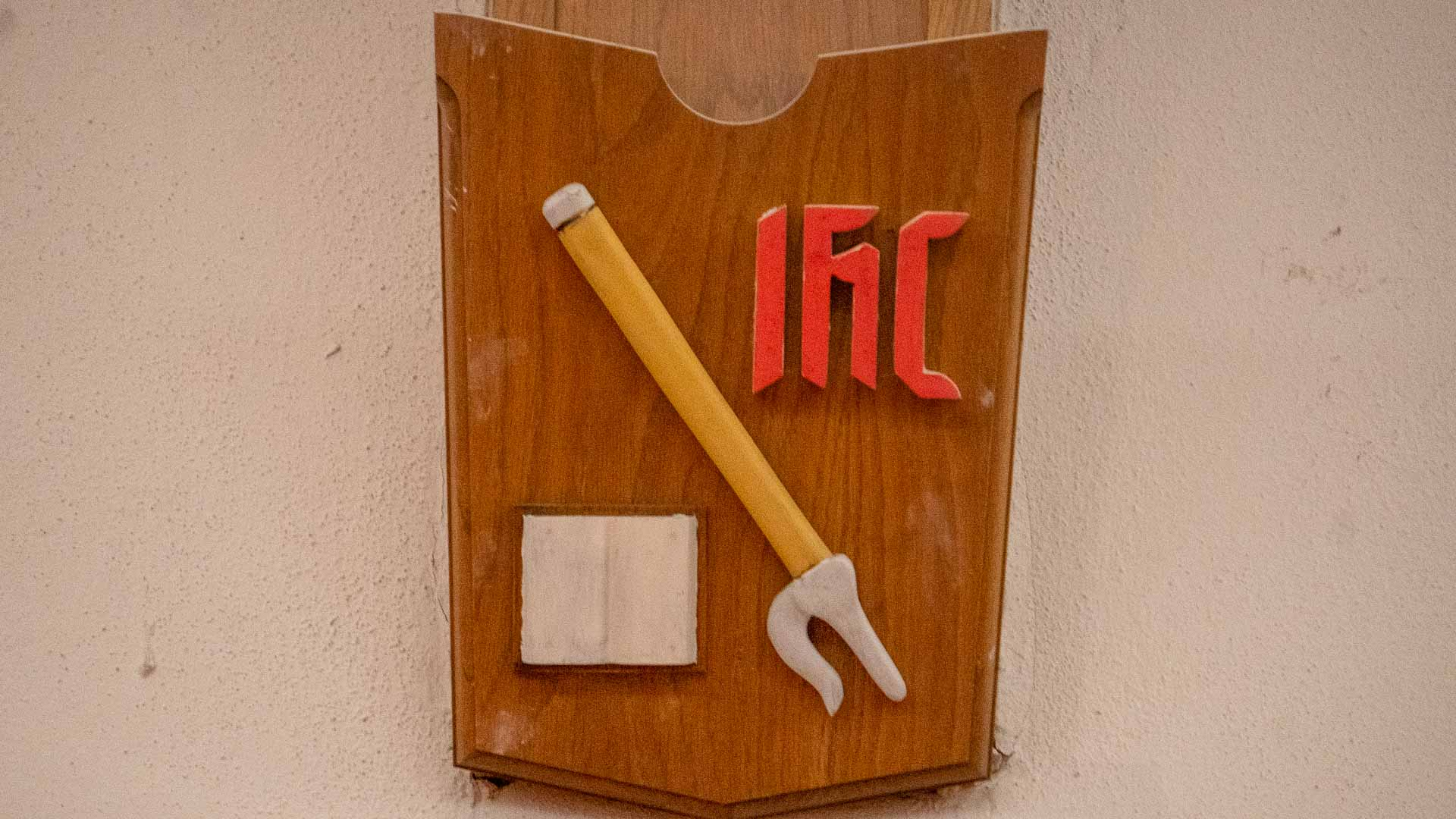
Simon

Continuing our journey, on the tenth shield we see a Boat Hook and Book; and represents Simon. Also known as Simon the Zealot, which was a political group that strongly opposed Roman rule over Israel. Simon spread the gospel in Egypt as a missionary and was martyred in Persia. The fishing boat hook symbolizes that he was a fisher of men. The book symbolizes the message of the gospel that he taught.

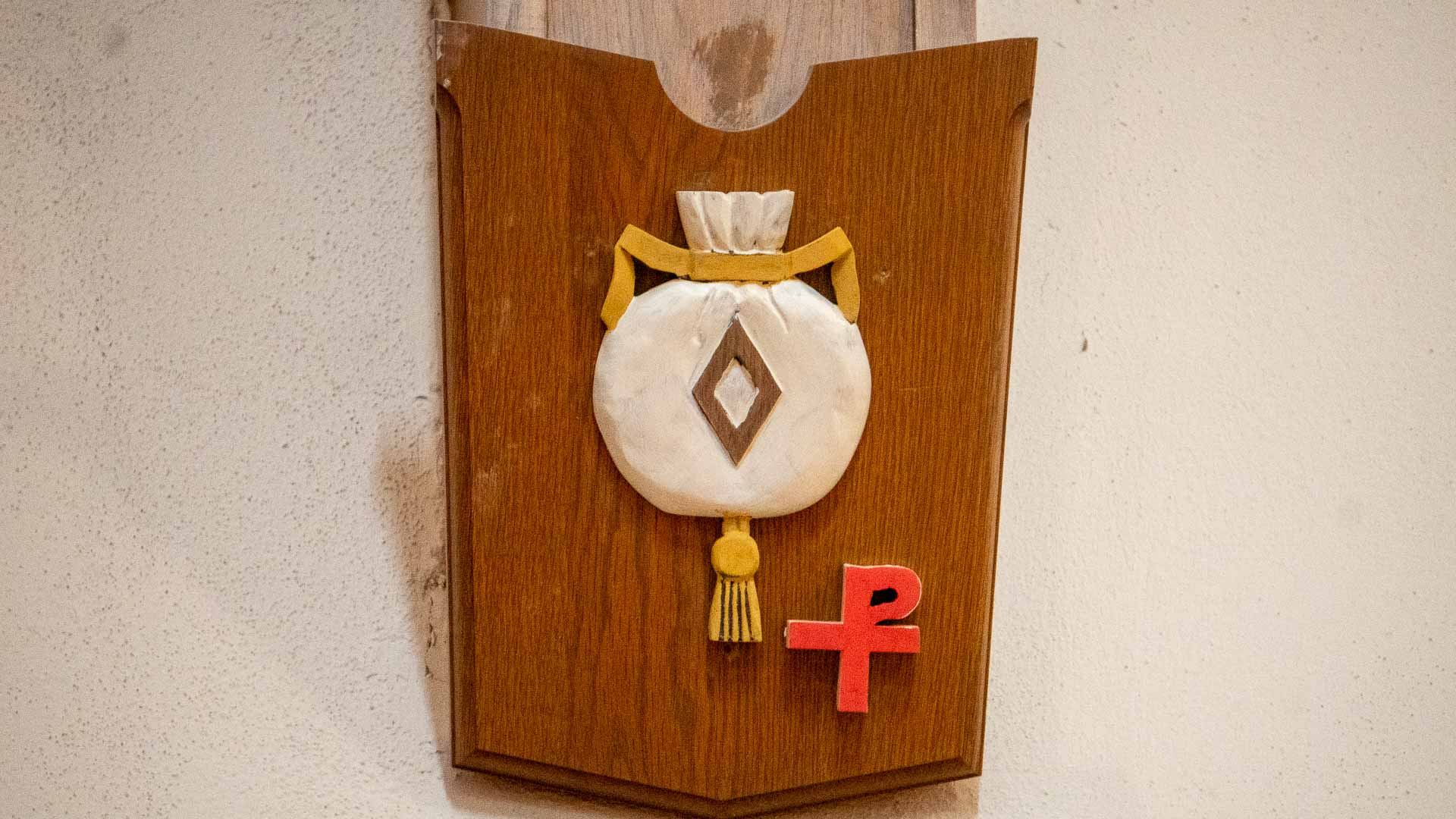
Matthew

The eleventh shield depicts a Money Bag; and this represents Matthew. Tradition does not agree on Matthew’s missionary travels; however, we do typically associate him with a mission to the Jews around Judea. Matthew’s symbol is a bag of money, which refers to his life as a tax collector. Sometimes the bag of money has an ax behind it to point to the method of his martyrdom.

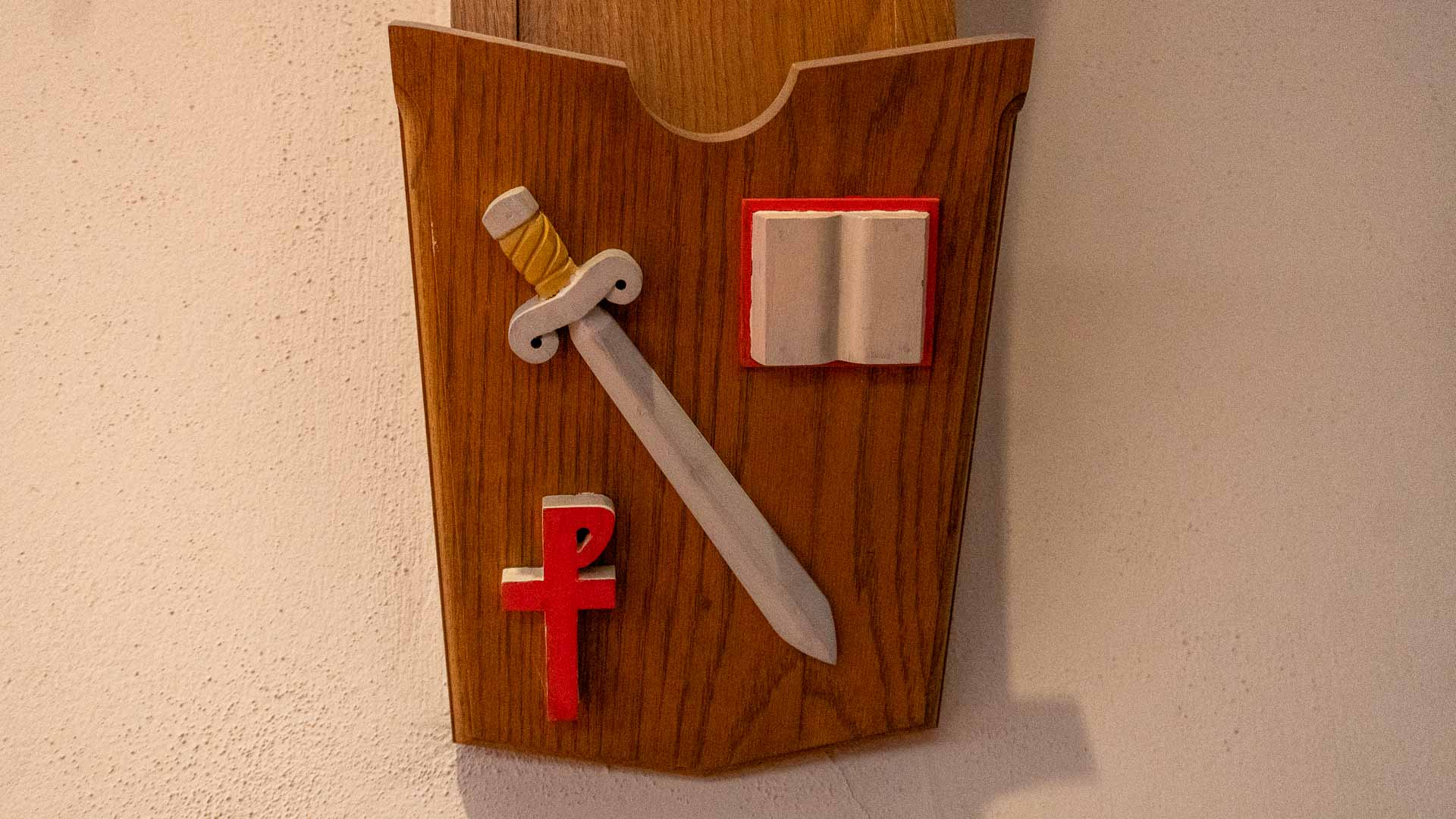
Matthias

The twelfth and final apostle shield on our visit is one depicting a Sword and Book; and this represents Matthias, Matthias was with Jesus since baptism by John the Baptist and was chosen to replace Judas who betrayed Jesus. Maintaining a group of 12 apostles was important, as Christ taught that these men were to sit upon 12 thrones in Heaven, each judging a tribe of Israel. An open Bible refers to his work as an apostle. The sword symbolized his martyrdom as he was beheaded.

== See also ==
- Fredericksburg, Texas
- Architecture of Fredericksburg, Texas
