= Gillespie County, Texas =

County in Texas, U.S.

- County
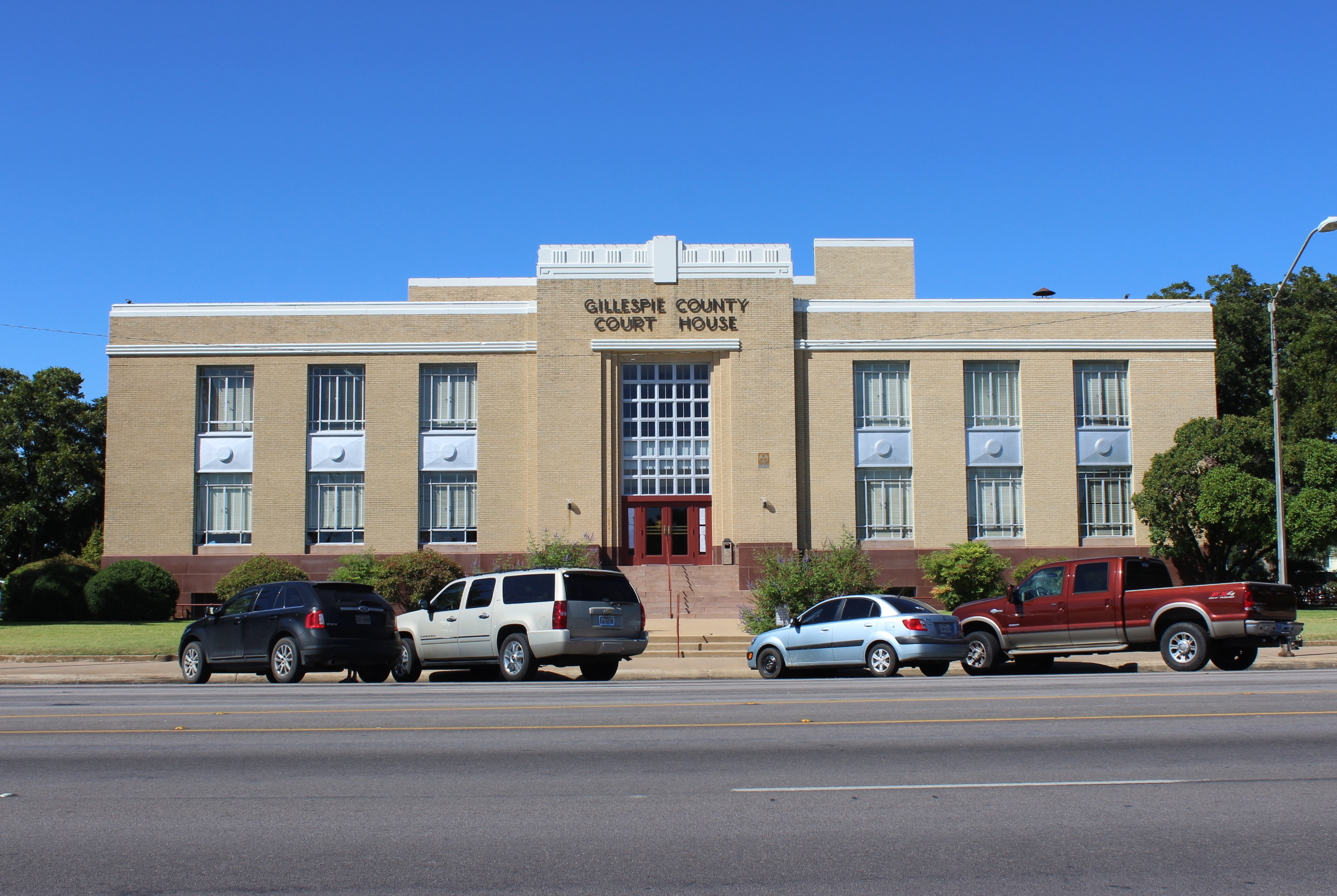
- The Gillespie County Courthouse in Fredericksburg

- Location within the U.S. state of Texas
- Coordinates: 30°19′N 98°57′W
- Country: United States
- State: Texas
- Founded: February 23, 1848
- Named for: Robert Addison Gillespie
- Seat: Fredericksburg
- Largest city: Fredericksburg

Area
  - Total: 1,062 sq mi (2,750 km^{2})
  - Land: 1,058 sq mi (2,740 km^{2})
  - Water: 3.5 sq mi (9.1 km^{2}) 0.3%

Population (2020)
  - Total: 26,725
  - Estimate (2025): 28,527 ▲
  - Density: 25.26/sq mi (9.753/km^{2})
- Time zone: UTC−6 (Central)
  - Summer (DST): UTC−5 (CDT)
- Congressional district: 21st
- Website: www.gillespiecounty.gov

Gillespie County is a county located on the Edwards Plateau in the U.S. state of Texas. Gillespie county is prominent in the Texas German belt region, a region settled by German emigrants in the 1800s. As of the 2020 census, its population was 26,725. Gillespie County comprises the Fredericksburg, TX Micropolitan Statistical Area. The county seat is Fredericksburg. It is located in the heart of the rural Texas Hill Country in Central Texas. Gillespie is named for Robert Addison Gillespie, a soldier in the Mexican–American War.

On December 15, 1847, a petition was submitted to create Gillespie County. In 1848, the legislature formed Gillespie County from Bexar and Travis Counties. The signers were overwhelmingly German immigrants.

President of the United States of America Lyndon B. Johnson was born in the county's unincorporated community of Stonewall, and where he later maintained his ranch.

== History ==
Early native inhabitants were the Tonkawa, Comanche, Kiowa, and Lipan Apache peoples. In 1842, the Adelsverein organized in Germany to promote emigration to Texas. The Fisher–Miller Land Grant set aside three million acres (12,000 km^{2}) to settle 600 families and single men of German, Dutch, Swiss, Danish, Swedish, and Norwegian ancestry in Texas. Henry Francis Fisher sold his interest in the land grant to the Adelsverein in 1844. Prince Carl of Solms-Braunfels secured the title to 1,265 acres (5.12 km^{2}) of the Veramendi grant the next year, including the Comal Springs and River, for the Adelsverein. Thousands of German immigrants were stranded at their port of disembarkation, Indianola, on Matagorda Bay. With no food or shelters, living in holes dug into the ground, an estimated 50% died from disease or starvation. The living began to walk to their destinations hundreds of miles away. About 200 German colonists, who walked from Indianola, founded the town of New Braunfels at the crossing of the San Antonio-Nacodoches Road on the Guadalupe River. John O. Meusebach arrived in Galveston. The first wagon train of 120 settlers arrived from New Braunfels. Surveyor Hermann Wilke laid out the town. Meusebach named it Fredericksburg, in honor of Prince Frederick of Prussia.

In 1847, the Meusebach–Comanche Treaty was made. About 150 settlers petitioned the Texas Legislature to establish a new county, suggested names "Pierdenales" or "Germania". The Vereins Kirche became the first public building in Fredericksburg. It served as a nondenominational church, school, town hall, and fort. Locals referred to it as “the Coffee Mill Church” for its shape. Wilhelm Victor Keidel was the county's first doctor. Mormon leader Lyman Wight founded the community of Zodiac.

The Legislature formed Gillespie County from Bexar and Travis Counties in 1848. They named it after Tennessee transplant Capt. Robert Addison Gillespie, a hero of the 1846 Battle of Monterrey in the Mexican–American War. Fredericksburg became the county seat.

Fort Martin Scott was established in 1848 at Barons Creek, a Pedernales tributary. An angry mob of soldiers burned down the store-courthouse in 1850, destroying all county records. The melee apparently started when County Clerk John M. Hunter, who also owned the store, refused to sell whiskey to a soldier. Words were exchanged, and Hunter stabbed the soldier; about 50 soldiers stormed and burned the store, destroying all contents. Soldiers prevented townspeople from saving the county records.

John O. Meusebach was elected to the Texas Senate in 1851 to represent Bexar, Comal, and Medina Counties, and in 1854, received a special appointment as commissioner from Governor Elisha M. Pease to issue land certificates to those immigrants of 1845 and 1846 who had been promised them by the Adelsverein. The Texas State Convention of Germans met in San Antonio and adopted a political, social, and religious platform, including: Equal pay for equal work, direct election of the President of the United States, abolition of capital punishment, "Slavery is an evil, the abolition of which is a requirement of democratic principles", free schools – including universities – supported by the state, without religious influence, and total separation of church and state.

In 1852, Bremen seaman Charles Henry Nimitz, grandfather of Fleet Admiral Chester Nimitz, built the Nimitz Hotel in Fredericksburg. In 1870, he added a steamboat-shaped façade.

Surveyor Jacob Kuechler was commissioned as a captain by Sam Houston to enroll state militia troops in Gillespie County. Texas seceded from the Union in 1861, and joined the Confederate States of America, and Houston was dismissed from office in March by the Confederacy. Gillespie County voted 400 -17 against secession from the Union. Unionists from Kerr, Gillespie, and Kendall Counties participated in the formation of the Union League, a secret organization to support President Abraham Lincoln's policies. Kuechler signed up only German Unionists in his frontier company, and was dismissed by Governor Francis R. Lubbock.

In 1862, 54 Gillespie County men joined the Confederate Army. Eventually, 300 enlisted with the CSA to avoid conscription. The Union League formed companies to protect the frontier against Indians and their families against local Confederate forces. Conscientious objectors to the military draft were primarily among Tejanos and Germans. Confederate authorities imposed martial law on Central Texas. The Nueces massacre occurred in Kinney County. Jacob Kuechler served as a guide for 61 conscientious objectors attempting to flee to Mexico. Scottish-born Confederate irregular James Duff and his Duff's Partisan Rangers pursued and overtook them at the Nueces River; 34 were killed, some executed after being taken prisoner. Jacob Kuechler survived the battle. The cruelty shocked the people of Gillespie County. About 2,000 took to the hills to escape Duff's reign of terror.

The Treue der Union Monument ("Loyalty to the Union") in Comfort was dedicated in 1866 to the Texans slain at the Nueces massacre. It is the only monument to the Union other than the National Cemeteries on Confederate territory. It is one of only six such sites allowed to fly the United States flag at half-mast in perpetuity. Spring Creek Cemetery near Harper in Gillespie County has a singular grave with the names Sebird Henderson, Hiram Nelson, Gus Tegener, and Frank Scott. The inscription reads “Hanged and thrown in Spring Creek by Col. James Duff’s Confederate Regiment.”

Kiowa raiders massacred residents of the McDonald farm in the Harper vicinity in 1864. During 1865, Gillespie County suffered a war-time crime wave, as 17 individuals were convicted of murder.

In 1870, Herman Lehmann and his brother Willie were captured by Apaches, but Willie escaped within days. Herman Lehmann, escorted by soldiers, was finally returned to his family in 1878.

in 1872, the last Indian raid in the county happened, resulting in the death of a man named Peter Hazlewood.

In 1881, Gillespie County became the first county in Texas to hold a fair.

From 1874 to 1875, Andreas Lindig built the county's first lime kiln. The original Gillespie County Courthouse was constructed in 1882; it later became the Pioneer Memorial Library.

Chester W. Nimitz, future Commander in Chief, United States Pacific Fleet, was born in 1885 in Fredericksburg. His father, Chester B. Nimitz, died before his birth, leaving his seaman grandfather as role model. John O. Meusebach died at his farm at Loyal Valley in Mason County on May 27, 1897, and was buried in the Marschall Meusebach Cemetery at Cherry Spring.

In 1908, future President of the United States Lyndon B. Johnson was born in a small farmhouse on the Pedernales River. Johnson became the Vice President of the United States in 1961 and subsequently President of the United States. His ranch at Stonewall was known as the Texas White House. Tourism became an important industry. Ranch Road 1 was designated in 1963. On January 22, 1973, President Johnson died at his Stonewall ranch. He, and later Lady Bird Johnson, were laid to rest at the family cemetery on the ranch.

The Gillespie County Historical Society was formed in 1934, and the Pedernales Electric Cooperative was formed to provide rural electrification four years later. In 1948, the county began its annual Easter Fire event to commemorate the Meusebach treaty signing.

Admiral Nimitz died February 20, 1966. The next February, the Fleet Admiral Chester W. Nimitz Memorial Naval Museum opened in the old Nimitz Hotel on Main Street in Fredericksburg.

The Japanese Garden of Peace, a gift from the people of Japan, was dedicated on the 130th anniversary of the founding of Fredericksburg at the Nimitz Museum on May 8, 1976. In 1981, the state legislature placed the Nimitz Museum under Texas Parks and Wildlife Department as the National Museum of the Pacific War.

The State of Texas opened Enchanted Rock State Natural Area after adding facilities in 1984. That same year, it is also added to the National Register of Historic Places,

The Texas White House officially opened to the public August 27, 2008. In 2009, the George H. W. Bush Gallery opened at the Nimitz museum.

== Geography ==
According to the U.S. Census Bureau, the county has a total area of 1,062 square miles (2,750 km^{2}), of which 1,058 square miles (2,740 km^{2}) is land and 3.5 square miles (9.1 km^{2}) (0.3%) is water.

=== Adjacent counties ===
- Mason County – northwest
- Llano County – northeast
- Blanco County – east
- Kendall County – south
- Kerr County – southwest
- Kimble County – west

=== Major highways ===
- Interstate 10
- U.S. Highway 87
- U.S. Highway 290
- State Highway 16
- Ranch to Market Road 783

=== National protected area ===
- Lyndon B. Johnson National Historical Park (part)

== Demographics ==
Historical population
| Census | Pop. | Note | %± |
|---|---|---|---|
| 1850 | 1,240 | | — |
| 1860 | 2,736 | | 120.6% |
| 1870 | 3,566 | | 30.3% |
| 1880 | 5,228 | | 46.6% |
| 1890 | 7,056 | | 35.0% |
| 1900 | 8,229 | | 16.6% |
| 1910 | 9,447 | | 14.8% |
| 1920 | 10,015 | | 6.0% |
| 1930 | 11,020 | | 10.0% |
| 1940 | 10,670 | | −3.2% |
| 1950 | 10,520 | | −1.4% |
| 1960 | 10,048 | | −4.5% |
| 1970 | 10,553 | | 5.0% |
| 1980 | 13,532 | | 28.2% |
| 1990 | 17,204 | | 27.1% |
| 2000 | 20,814 | | 21.0% |
| 2010 | 24,837 | | 19.3% |
| 2020 | 26,725 | | 7.6% |
| 2025 (est.) | 28,527 | ▲ | 6.7% |
U.S. Decennial Census; 1850–2010 2010 2020

=== Racial and ethnic composition ===
Gillespie County, Texas – Racial and ethnic composition Note: the US Census treats Hispanic/Latino as an ethnic category. This table excludes Latinos from the racial categories and assigns them to a separate category. Hispanics/Latinos may be of any race.
| Race / Ethnicity (NH = Non-Hispanic) | Pop 1980 | Pop 1990 | Pop 2000 | Pop 2010 | Pop 2020 | % 1980 | % 1990 | % 2000 | % 2010 | % 2020 |
|---|---|---|---|---|---|---|---|---|---|---|
| White alone (NH) | 12,120 | 14,676 | 17,232 | 19,472 | 19,884 | 89.57% | 85.31% | 82.79% | 78.40% | 74.40% |
| Black or African American alone (NH) | 21 | 29 | 30 | 47 | 84 | 0.16% | 0.17% | 0.14% | 0.19% | 0.31% |
| Native American or Alaska Native alone (NH) | 19 | 43 | 58 | 68 | 69 | 0.14% | 0.25% | 0.28% | 0.27% | 0.26% |
| Asian alone (NH) | 4 | 24 | 35 | 88 | 127 | 0.03% | 0.14% | 0.17% | 0.35% | 0.48% |
| Native Hawaiian or Pacific Islander alone (NH) | x | x | 4 | 11 | 1 | x | x | 0.02% | 0.04% | 0.00% |
| Other race alone (NH) | 9 | 6 | 9 | 28 | 100 | 0.07% | 0.03% | 0.04% | 0.11% | 0.37% |
| Mixed race or Multiracial (NH) | x | x | 137 | 154 | 694 | x | x | 0.66% | 0.62% | 2.60% |
| Hispanic or Latino (any race) | 1,359 | 2,426 | 3,309 | 4,969 | 5,766 | 10.04% | 14.10% | 15.90% | 20.01% | 21.58% |
| Total | 13,532 | 17,204 | 20,814 | 24,837 | 26,725 | 100.00% | 100.00% | 100.00% | 100.00% | 100.00% |

=== 2020 census ===
As of the 2020 census, the county had a population of 26,725, a median age of 53.2 years, 18.0% of residents under the age of 18, 32.4% of residents 65 years of age or older, 93.6 males for every 100 females, and 91.6 males for every 100 females age 18 and over.

The racial makeup of the county was 80.0% White, 0.4% Black or African American, 0.6% American Indian and Alaska Native, 0.5% Asian, <0.1% Native Hawaiian and Pacific Islander, 5.9% from some other race, and 12.6% from two or more races. Hispanic or Latino residents of any race comprised 21.6% of the population.

43.6% of residents lived in urban areas, while 56.4% lived in rural areas.

There were 11,486 households in the county, of which 22.6% had children under the age of 18 living in them. Of all households, 55.8% were married-couple households, 16.1% were households with a male householder and no spouse or partner present, and 24.4% were households with a female householder and no spouse or partner present. About 29.0% of all households were made up of individuals and 17.6% had someone living alone who was 65 years of age or older.

There were 14,128 housing units, of which 18.7% were vacant. Among occupied housing units, 74.5% were owner-occupied and 25.5% were renter-occupied. The homeowner vacancy rate was 1.9% and the rental vacancy rate was 8.3%.

=== 2000 census ===
As of the 2000 census, 20,814 people resided in the county, organized into 8,521 households, and 6,083 families. The population density was 20 people per square mile (7.7 people/km^{2}). The 9,902 housing units averaged nine per square mile (3.5/km^{2}). The racial makeup of the county was 92.82% White, 0.33% Native American, 0.21% Black or African American, 0.18% Asian, 0.02% Pacific Islander, 5.27% from other races and 1.18% from two or more races. About 15.90% of the population was Hispanic or Latino of any race. In terms of ancestry, 40.8% were of German, 10.3% were of English, 10.0% were of Irish, 6.0% were of American, 3.1% were of Scotch-Irish, 2.5% were of Scottish,2.5% were of French. In 1990, about 3,000 speakers of Texas German were in Gillespie and Kendall Counties, but this is believed to have declined since.

Of the 8,521 households, 25.90% had children under the age of 18 living with them, 62.10% were married couples living together, 7.00% had a female householder with no husband present, and 28.60% were not families. About 25.80% of all households were made up of individuals, and 14.20% had someone living alone who was 65 years of age or older. The average household size was 2.38 and the average family size was 2.84.

In the county, the population was distributed as 21.60% under the age of 18, 5.50% from 18 to 24, 21.20% from 25 to 44, 26.20% from 45 to 64, and 25.50% who were 65 years of age or older. The median age was 46 years. For every 100 females, there were 89.70 males. For every 100 females age 18 and over, there were 88.10 males.

The median income for a household in the county was $38,109, and for a family was $45,315. Males had a median income of $26,675 versus $20,918 for females. The per capita income for the county was $20,423, and 10.20% of the population and 7.10% of families were below the poverty line. Of the total population, 13.40% of those under the age of 18 and 9.90% of those 65 and older were living below the poverty line.

== Politics ==
Gillespie County is part of the 21st District in the United States House of Representatives, represented by Republican Chip Roy, the 25th district of the Texas State Senate, represented by Republican Donna Campbell, and the 19th District of the Texas House of Representatives and is represented by Republican Ellen Troxclair.

Historically, the county was a massive outlier in Texas. While Texas was overwhelmingly Democratic up until recent decades, Gillespie County has long been a Republican stronghold. This is largely due to the heavily German American heritage of the county and that Gillespie was the fountainhead of Texas’ small Unionist movement during the Civil War. Most Texas Germans acquiesced to secession, but Fredericksburg was still self-sufficient and sold surplus food to the army.

Gillespie County has been won by Republicans in every election since 1896 with only four exceptions. Theodore Roosevelt's Progressive Party won the county in 1912 (but carried no other counties in the state). In 1924, it was one of only two Texas counties won by Progressive candidate Robert M. La Follette. Gillespie County has backed a Democratic nominee only twice since the 19th century: in 1932 and 1964, both of which were landslide victories for the party, and the latter being for county native Lyndon Johnson. No Democrat since Jimmy Carter in 1976 has received so much as 22 percent of the county's vote.

Franklin D. Roosevelt won the county by almost 60 percentage points in 1932, despite the county's massive Republican lean. At his fourth and final election in 1944, he received less than one-tenth of its vote – a decline of more than 70 percentage points from his first election in the county.

United States presidential election results for Gillespie County, Texas
| Year | Republican | | Democratic | | Third party(ies) | |
| Year | No. | % | No. | % | No. | % |
|---|---|---|---|---|---|---|
| 1912 | 219 | 13.70% | 307 | 19.20% | 1,073 | 67.10% |
| 1916 | 1,463 | 77.74% | 405 | 21.52% | 14 | 0.74% |
| 1920 | 1,270 | 60.36% | 137 | 6.51% | 697 | 33.13% |
| 1924 | 768 | 28.42% | 352 | 13.03% | 1,582 | 58.55% |
| 1928 | 1,447 | 55.12% | 1,174 | 44.72% | 4 | 0.15% |
| 1932 | 662 | 19.96% | 2,642 | 79.65% | 13 | 0.39% |
| 1936 | 1,421 | 56.52% | 1,016 | 40.41% | 77 | 3.06% |
| 1940 | 3,213 | 86.74% | 487 | 13.15% | 4 | 0.11% |
| 1944 | 2,950 | 82.56% | 333 | 9.32% | 290 | 8.12% |
| 1948 | 2,741 | 80.31% | 593 | 17.37% | 79 | 2.31% |
| 1952 | 3,687 | 92.29% | 300 | 7.51% | 8 | 0.20% |
| 1956 | 3,070 | 92.61% | 240 | 7.24% | 5 | 0.15% |
| 1960 | 2,687 | 76.62% | 816 | 23.27% | 4 | 0.11% |
| 1964 | 1,695 | 42.80% | 2,264 | 57.17% | 1 | 0.03% |
| 1968 | 2,945 | 71.74% | 725 | 17.66% | 435 | 10.60% |
| 1972 | 3,490 | 85.67% | 526 | 12.91% | 58 | 1.42% |
| 1976 | 3,541 | 72.49% | 1,260 | 25.79% | 84 | 1.72% |
| 1980 | 4,736 | 78.70% | 1,170 | 19.44% | 112 | 1.86% |
| 1984 | 5,496 | 82.63% | 1,137 | 17.10% | 18 | 0.27% |
| 1988 | 5,662 | 77.42% | 1,588 | 21.71% | 63 | 0.86% |
| 1992 | 4,712 | 56.28% | 1,600 | 19.11% | 2,060 | 24.61% |
| 1996 | 5,867 | 71.98% | 1,655 | 20.30% | 629 | 7.72% |
| 2000 | 8,096 | 81.61% | 1,511 | 15.23% | 313 | 3.16% |
| 2004 | 9,297 | 80.47% | 2,104 | 18.21% | 152 | 1.32% |
| 2008 | 9,563 | 77.51% | 2,576 | 20.88% | 199 | 1.61% |
| 2012 | 10,306 | 82.12% | 2,055 | 16.37% | 189 | 1.51% |
| 2016 | 10,446 | 79.05% | 2,288 | 17.31% | 480 | 3.63% |
| 2020 | 12,514 | 78.95% | 3,176 | 20.04% | 160 | 1.01% |
| 2024 | 13,202 | 80.05% | 3,160 | 19.16% | 130 | 0.79% |

United States Senate election results for Gillespie County, Texas1
| Year | Republican | | Democratic | | Third party(ies) | |
| Year | No. | % | No. | % | No. | % |
|---|---|---|---|---|---|---|
| 2024 | 12,881 | 78.01% | 3,296 | 19.96% | 334 | 2.02% |

United States Senate election results for Gillespie County, Texas2
| Year | Republican | | Democratic | | Third party(ies) | |
| Year | No. | % | No. | % | No. | % |
|---|---|---|---|---|---|---|
| 2020 | 12,543 | 79.49% | 2,996 | 18.99% | 240 | 1.52% |

Texas Gubernatorial election results for Gillespie County
| Year | Republican | | Democratic | | Third party(ies) | |
| Year | No. | % | No. | % | No. | % |
|---|---|---|---|---|---|---|
| 2022 | 10,801 | 80.67% | 2,421 | 18.08% | 167 | 1.25% |

== Communities ==
=== City ===
- Fredericksburg (county seat)

=== Census-designated places ===
- Harper
- Stonewall

=== Unincorporated communities ===
- Blumenthal
- Cave Creek
- Cherry Spring
- Crabapple
- Doss
- Grapetown
- Luckenbach
- Rheingold
- Tivydale
- Willow City
- Wrede

=== Ghost towns ===
- Albert
- Cain City
- Eckert
- Morris Ranch
- Pedernales
- Zodiac

== Education ==
School districts in the county include:

- Doss Consolidated Common School District
- Fredericksburg Independent School District
- Harper Independent School District

It is within Central Texas College's attendance area.

== Notable people ==
- President Lyndon B. Johnson was born in Stonewall, in the eastern part of the county. The Lyndon B. Johnson National Historical Park, which includes much of the former president's LBJ Ranch, is located just outside Stonewall.
- Joseph Wilson Baines, Secretary of State of Texas, grandfather of U.S. president Lyndon Baines Johnson.
- Admiral Chester W. Nimitz was born in a house that still stands on Main Street in Fredericksburg. Nimitz, who grew up in Fredericksburg and in nearby Kerrville, graduated from the United States Naval Academy, rose to the rank of Fleet Admiral and commanded the Pacific Fleet during World War II.
- Betty Holekamp, German colonist and pioneer, lived on a 320-acre (1.3 km^{2}) parcel near Fredericksburg.
- Susan Weddington, state chairman of the Republican Party of Texas from 1997 to 2003, retired to Fredericksburg.

== See also ==
- Adelsverein
- German Texan
- Der Stadt Friedhof pioneer cemetery
- Fredericksburg Theater Company
- Fredericksburg Memorial Library
- History of Fredericksburg, Texas
- Gillespie County Historical Society
- List of museums in Central Texas
- Lower South Grape Creek School
- National Register of Historic Places Listings in Gillespie County, Texas
- National Register of Historic Places listings in the Alamo region of Texas: Other
- Recorded Texas Historic Landmarks in Gillespie County
- Zion Lutheran Church
