= Ranch Road 1 =

Road in Texas, U.S.

Ranch Road 1
- RR 1 highlighted in red

Route information
- Maintained by TxDOT
- Length: 6.587 mi (10.601 km)
- Existed: 1963–present

Major junctions
- West end: US 290 in Stonewall
- RM 1623 in Stonewall
- East end: US 290 near Hye

Location
- Country: United States
- State: Texas
- Counties: Gillespie, Blanco

Highway system
- Highways in Texas; Interstate; US; State; Former; Toll; Loops; Spurs; FM/RM; Park; Rec
← FM 1	→ PR 1

Ranch Road 1 (RR 1) is a 6.587-mile (10.6 km) state road in Gillespie and Blanco counties, in the central region of Texas, United States. It begins at U.S. Route 290 (US 290) in Stonewall, running along the Pedernales River through Lyndon B. Johnson National Historical Park, the late President Lyndon Johnson's former ranch, and through Lyndon B. Johnson State Park and Historic Site, before terminating at US 290 near Hye. The road, designated in 1963, is the only road in the state that the Texas Department of Transportation (TxDOT) has designated as a "Ranch Road". In the earliest days of the state highway system, the route was a part of State Highway 20, and was later part of US 290 before that highway was relocated to the south.

== Route description ==
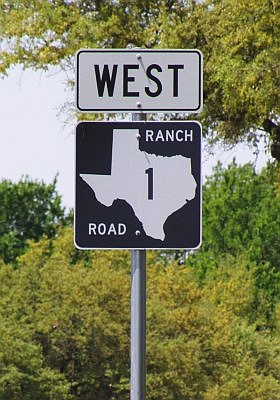
Route sign for Ranch Road 1, September 2005. (Despite RR 1 not being a Ranch to Market Road, it is still signed with the Texas Ranch to Market Road 1 shield.)

RR 1 begins at US 290 on the west side of Stonewall, as a two-lane, paved road. The highway follows along the south bank of the Pedernales River around the town's north side and intersects RM 1623 on the town's east side. The route continues along the river briefly passing through a narrow southwestern portion of Lyndon B. Johnson National Historical Park, before entering Lyndon B Johnson State Park and Historic Site. The route crosses the length of the state park at its northern edge along the riverbank and exits the park before intersecting PR 49, which crosses the river accessing the national historic site. After crossing into Blanco County, the route turns away from the riverbank to the southeast returning to US 290 west of Hye. Although the road is located in the Texas Hill Country, the road only encounters gentle grades within the channel of the Pedernales River.

=== Classification ===
RR 1 is classified by TxDOT as a Ranch Road and is the only highway in the state currently categorized as such. The route is not officially part of the state's Farm and Ranch to Market Road System, although it is considered similar to the Farm to Market Road system. Notwithstanding, RR 1 is signed with the Ranch to Market Road 1 shield. (Ranch Road 1 should also not be confused with being part of the Recreational Roads, which also use the "RR" abbreviation.)

== History ==
Ranch Road 1 was designated on December 19, 1963, 27 days after Lyndon Johnson was sworn in as president, from its current western terminus at US 290 near Stonewall to a point 1.2 miles (1.9 km) west of the county line between Gillespie and Blanco counties. The following year, the road was extended 2.1 mi (3.4 km) eastward to its present terminus near Hye. The route was originally part of SH 20. In 1935, US 290 was routed over the road, and the SH 20 designation was dropped in the 1939 general redescription of the state highway system. US 290 was rerouted south to its current location sometime between 1941 and 1961.

== Major intersections ==
County	Location	mi	km	Destinations	Notes
Gillespie	Stonewall	0.000	0.000	US 290 east US 290 west – Fredericksburg	Western terminus; T intersection
Gillespie	Stonewall	1.259	2.026	RM 1623 north – RM 2721 RM 1623 south – US 290, Albert, Blanco	
Gillespie		3.174	5.108	PR 52 south – State Park parking lot, US 290	T intersection Lyndon B. Johnson State Park and Historic Site
Gillespie		4.734	7.619	PR 49 north (Klein Road) – Lyndon B. Johnson National Historical Park	T intersection
Blanco		6.587	10.601	US 290 east – Johnson City US 290 west	Eastern terminus; T intersection
1.000 mi = 1.609 km; 1.000 km = 0.621 mi
