= Ranch to Market Road 1623 =

Road in Texas

Ranch to Market Road 1623

Route information
- Maintained by TxDOT
- Length: 23.386 mi (Note: The certified length given is shorter than the actual mileage, as the TxDOT description of RM 1623 considers it to be discontinuous at US 290.) (37.636 km)
- Existed: 1951–present

Major junctions
- North end: RM 2721 north of Stonewall (Note: The section between RM 2721 and US 290 in Stonewall is signed north–south, but the majority of the route is signed west–east.)
- US 290 in Stonewall
- East end: US 281 in Blanco

Location
- Country: United States
- State: Texas
- Counties: Gillespie, Blanco

Highway system
- Highways in Texas; Interstate; US; State; Former; Toll; Loops; Spurs; FM/RM; Park; Rec
← FM 1622	→ FM 1624

Ranch to Market Road 1623 (RM 1623) is a 23.386-mile (37.636 km) farm to market road in Gillespie and Blanco counties, Texas.

== Route description ==
RM 1623 begins in eastern Gillespie County at an intersection with RM 2721. It travels to the south into Stonewall, where it crosses Ranch Road 1, and has a one-block eastward concurrency with US 290 before continuing southward. It then turns to the southeast and crosses into Blanco County. The route intersects RM 1888 before turning to the east and running along the north bank of the Blanco River into Blanco. The RM 1623 designation ends at US 281 in central Blanco; the roadway continues as Loop 163.

== History ==
FM 1623 was first designated in Blanco County in 1951, and ran from US 281 in Blanco to the west approximately 5.0 mi (8.0 km). Its length was extended to 10.3 mi in 1953 and increased again in 1954; the designation ended at the Gillespie County line. The extension into Gillespie County and to US 290 would be approved in 1955. The route was redesignated in 1969 as an RM route, the same year the extension to RM 2721 was added.

== Major intersections ==
County	Location	mi	km	Destinations	Notes
Gillespie		0.0	0.0	RM 2721 – Fredericksburg	Northern terminus
Gillespie	Stonewall	3.0	4.8	RR 1	
Gillespie	Stonewall	3.4	5.5	US 290 west – Fredericksburg	Northern end of US 290 concurrency
Gillespie	Stonewall	3.6	5.8	US 290 east – Johnson City	Eastern end of US 290 concurrency
Blanco		18.4	29.6	RM 1888 (River Road) – Luckenbach	
Blanco	Blanco	23.6	38.0	US 281 – Johnson City, San Antonio; 4th Street east (Loop 163 south)	Eastern terminus; roadway continues as 4th Street
1.000 mi = 1.609 km; 1.000 km = 0.621 mi: Concurrency terminus
