= U.S. Route 290 =

Highway in Texas

U.S. Highway 290
- US 290 highlighted in red

Route information
- Auxiliary route of US 90
- Maintained by TxDOT
- Length: 261.187 mi (420.340 km)
- Existed: 1927–present

Major junctions
- West end: I-10 near Segovia
- US 87 in Fredericksburg; US 281 in Johnson City; I-35 in Austin; US 183 in Austin; US 77 in Giddings
- East end: I-610 in Houston

Location
- Country: United States
- State: Texas
- Counties: Kimble, Gillespie, Blanco, Hays, Travis, Bastrop, Lee, Fayette, Washington, Waller, Harris

Highway system
- United States Numbered Highway System; List; Special; Divided; Highways in Texas; Interstate; US; State; Former; Toll; Loops; Spurs; FM/RM; Park; Rec
← SH 289	→ SH 290

U.S. Route 290 (US 290) is an east–west U.S. Highway located entirely within the state of Texas. Its western terminus is at Interstate 10 southeast of Segovia, and its eastern terminus is at Interstate 610 in northwest Houston. It is the main highway between Houston and Austin and is a cutoff for travelers wanting to bypass San Antonio on Interstate 10. Throughout its length west of Austin, US 290 cuts across mountainous hills comprising the Texas Hill Country and the Edwards Plateau; between Austin and Houston, the highway then travels through gradually hilly grasslands and pine forests comprising the Gulf Coastal Plains.

In its original designation in 1926, US 290 originally traveled from US 80 in Reeves County to terminate in San Antonio; though the highway still retains its designation from southeast of Segovia to Fredericksburg, I-10 and US 87 replaced much of the old routing in 1935. US 290 also received several minor re-routings east of Austin in 1951 that moved it further north, eliminating the old SH 20; the old routings were replaced by SH 71 and SH 21. While US 290 does not directly connect to its parent route of U.S. Route 90, ramps at its eastern terminus lead to US 90 and I-10.

== Route description ==
US 290 begins from I-10 roughly 12 miles (19 km) southeast of Segovia. It begins to travel due east through rural farmlands in the Texas Hill Country before reaching Harper, where it is the main west–east road in the town. Afterwards, US 290 begins making slight curves as it crosses several creeks and tributaries until it joins US 87 and runs as Main Street through Fredericksburg. The two highways travel together for 11 blocks in downtown Fredericksburg before US 87 splits south of US 290 at an intersection directly south of the National Museum of the Pacific War. Traveling due south, US 290 returns to an eastward path after crossing the Pedernales River, where it serves as a major artery for Fredericksburg's agricultural district, including Wildseed Farms. The highway then runs parallel to the Pedernales River, and after passing Stonewall, serves the south side of LBJ Ranch. As the Pedernales River arcs further north, US 290 continues east through several wineries before approaching Johnson City and bordering the north side of the LBJ Johnson City Unit. US 290 runs along Main Street throughout downtown Johnson City as it joins US 281 and heads south.

After traveling through additional hilly terrain, US 290 splits east from US 281 and twists through slopes in the Edwards Plateau, where an intersection with RM 3232 in the unincorporated community of Henly provides access to Pedernales Falls State Park. US 290 then curves south to serve downtown Dripping Springs, and then serves various residential areas as it crosses into southwest Austin. The highway then begins a concurrency with SH 71 at a series of traffic lights and travels through Austin's Oak Hill district before becoming a five-to-six-lane freeway. In the community of Sunset Valley, US 290 has interchanges with Loop 1 (MoPac Expressway) and Loop 360 (Capital of Texas Highway) providing access to the Barton Creek Greenbelt, and is then designated as Ben White Boulevard while it travels through south-central Austin, crossing the UPRR Austin Subdivision railroad in the process. Shortly afterward, US 290 splits north from SH 71 in a stack interchange to run concurrent with I-35.

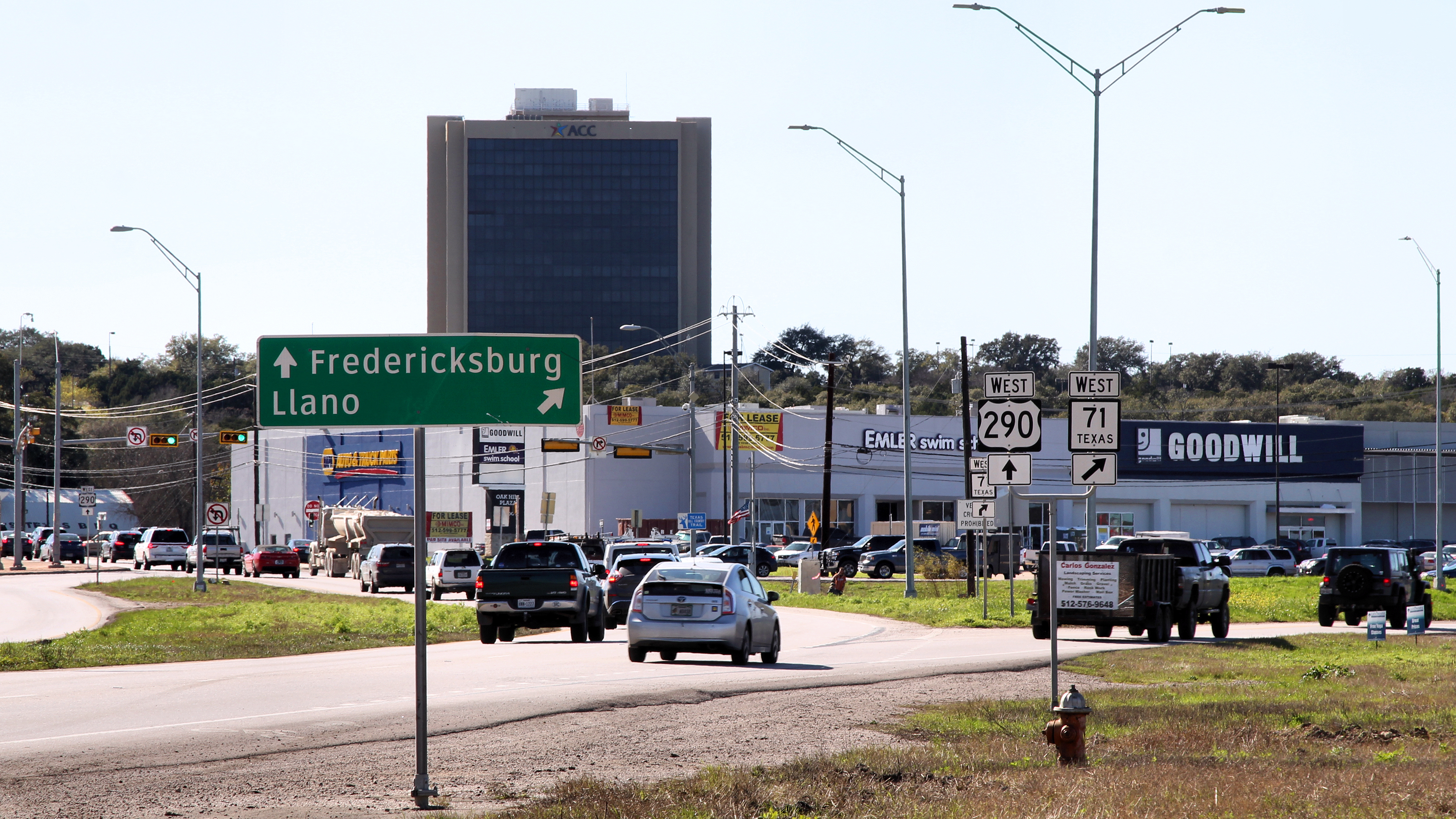
The west end of US 290's concurrency with SH 71 is located near the Oak Hill district in Austin.

Upon beginning its concurrency with I-35, US 290 travels through the suburban Riverside and Travis Heights districts while also serving St. Edward's University. After crossing the Colorado River, I-35 and US 290 cut between downtown Austin and the East Cesar Chavez district, being the only major highways to serve the Austin Convention Center and the Texas State Capitol. Just prior to bordering the east side of the main University of Texas at Austin campus, I-35 and US 290 split into two decks for about 2 miles (3.2 km), resurfacing close to the former Mueller Airport. US 290 then splits due east from I-35 southeast of the former Highland Mall as a four-lane freeway. Not long after, US 290 has an interchange with US 183 and promptly becomes a toll road designated as the Manor Expressway. It then travels through much of industrial East Austin and Daffan before reverting to a four-lane divided highway after an interchange with SH 130, less than a mile shy of Manor. US 290 then makes its way through rolling meadows dotted with suburban areas in northeast Travis County, then travels through southern Elgin where it forms a brief concurrency with SH 95. Passing through the town of McDade, US 290 cuts through piney woods north of the Lost Pines Forest and has an interchange with SH 21 west of Paige. US 290 continues east, running parallel to the Austin and Northwestern Railroad east branch until approaching Giddings, where the highway travels along Austin Street, intersecting US 77 near the town's center.

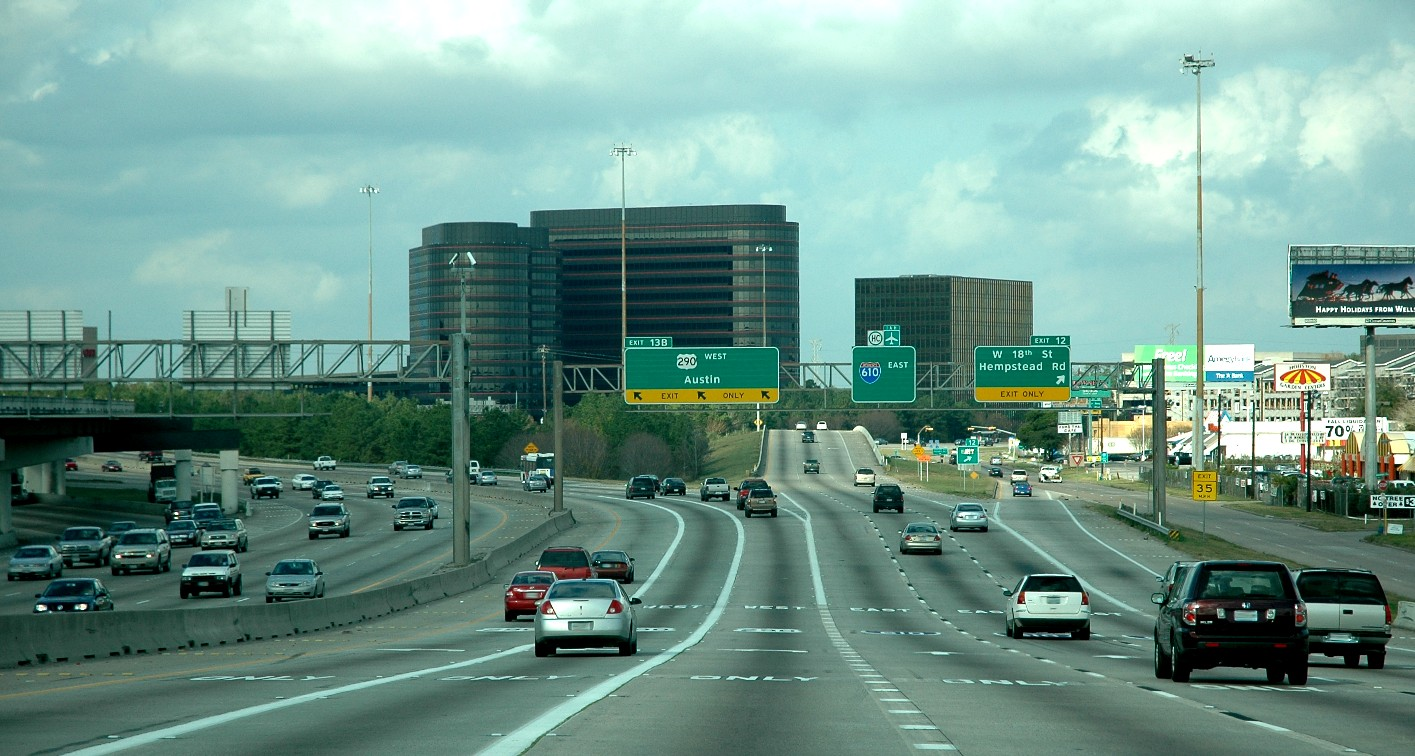
I-610 at US 290's eastern terminus in Houston, before 2012

US 290 travels southeast to Ledbetter, where it then travels through additional grassland before bounding northeast to Burton. The highway then enters Brenham, where it briefly joins SH 36 to serve Blinn College and bypass the city as a four-lane freeway. After exiting Brenham, US 290 runs parallel to the old Washington County Railroad and goes through Chappell Hill to serve every historic landmark there, then crosses the Brazos River to move through a rural auto-industrial area. SH 6 joins US 290 north of Hempstead at a hybrid interchange with direct ramps from westbound US 290/northbound SH 6 to northbound SH 6, and from southbound SH 6 to eastbound US 290/southbound SH 6; thereafter, the two routes become a four-lane freeway notable for its role as a hurricane evacuation route. Running parallel to the Houston and Texas Central Railway from the north, US 290 finally comes right next to it roughly 3 miles (4.8 km) prior to intersecting SH 99. The highway is then designated as Northwest Freeway (legally as the Ronald Reagan Memorial Highway) as it travels through the suburb of Cypress, later splitting off SH 6 to the south in the suburb of Jersey Village. Following an interchange with the Sam Houston Tollway, US 290 serves several businesses and neighborhoods in northwest Houston before terminating at an interchange with I-610 west of the Lazybrook/Timbergrove district.

== History ==
=== Texas State Highways 20 and 20A (1917–1951) ===
State Highway 20
- Location: Austin–Paige
- Existed: 1917–1951

On June 21, 1917, the department's Office of State Highway Engineer issued a proposal for the state highway system. The proposal included SH 20 originally planned as the Austin-Houston Highway between Austin and Houston by way of Bastrop, Giddings, Brenham, and Hempstead. On July 17, 1917, the planned route was extended from Austin to Brady by way of Burnet, Llano, and Mason. On December 17, 1918, SH 20 was rerouted away from Bastrop, with the section from Austin to Bastrop transferred to SH 3A. The section of SH 20 from Hempstead to Houston was cancelled as it was already part of the Gulf Division Branch of SH 2.

State Highway 20A
- Location: Between Kerrville and Junction–Fredericksburg
- Existed: 1928–1930

On November 19, 1917, an intercounty highway from Austin through Johnson City to Fredericksburg was designated. On January 20, 1919, this was changed to an auxiliary route of Highway 20, Highway 20A. The highway routes remained unchanged in a 1922 proposal that rated both routes as "second class" under a three-tier system.

On August 21, 1923, SH 20 in the new highway system was routed over the previously proposed Highway 20A from Fredericksburg to Austin and then over the proposed Highway 20 to Hempstead as a second class highway. The old route to Leander was cancelled, and northwest of there became part of SH 43 when it was extended southwest. In 1924, the state highway department assumed responsibility to maintain all state highways which were previously maintained by the counties. The following year, state lawmakers vest the department with the authority to acquire right of way, survey, plan, and build highways. On August 10, 1925, SH 20 was given a third class extension to Kerrville. On February 20, 1928, SH 20 was given an auxiliary route SH 20A from Fredericksburg to a point on the highway between Kerrville and Junction. All of the highway from Fredericksburg to Hempstead was classified as a "secondary federal highway". The portion between Fredericksburg and Kerrville along with the new auxiliary route were classified as "state highways" eligible for state aid only.

On March 19, 1930, the SH 20 designation was dropped over the Fredericksburg to Kerrville highway (replaced by an extended SH 81) and extended instead over the auxiliary route SH 20A. In 1933 the road was described between Fredericksburg and Hempstead as paved except for the portion in Hays County around Dripping Springs and a short portion west of Elgin that were described as surfaced. The portion west of Fredericksburg toward Junction was graded earth. In 1935, US 290 was routed over SH 20 except for the portion between Austin and Paige where US 290 was routed further south through Bastrop. By 1936, the formerly surfaced portion west of Elgin had been paved, but the Hays County portion remained merely surfaced. West of Fredericksburg, the Gillespie County portion had been surfaced while the Kimble County portion remained as an improved earth road. On September 26, 1939, the SH 20 designation was dropped along all portions of the route running along US 290 as a result of that day's general redescription of the state highway system, leaving SH 20 as a greatly shortened route running from Austin to US 290 near Paige. On May 23, 1951, US 290 was relocated away from Bastrop northward along SH 20 which was then decommissioned.

=== Other original routings ===
In its original designation in the late 1920s, US 290 traveled from an intersection with US 80 in western Reeves County to an eastern terminus in San Antonio. On March 1, 1935, US 290 was re-routed further north to terminate in Houston, and the previous alignment from Fredericksburg to San Antonio was redesignated as US 87. Following the 1935 re-routing, US 290 traveled through much of its present-day routing, with the exception of a designation traveling through Austin and Bastrop before following the Old San Antonio Road to Paige. On May 23, 1951, US 290 was rerouted further north to Elgin, while the original routing was transferred to SH 71 from Austin to Bastrop, and SH 21 from Bastrop to Paige.

Through Austin, US 290 originally followed Lamar Boulevard and Cesar Chavez Street to I-35 (then US 81). On May 30, 1951, US 290 and SH 71 were both rerouted onto their present-day designations on Ben White Boulevard, and the old designations were transferred to Loop 343.

On November 21, 1991, the US 290 designation was deleted between the old US 80 junction and its current western terminus southeast of Segovia due to being supplanted by I-10. Much of the old route near Sheffield became SH 290. Other former alignments that are part of the state highway system include the Fort Stockton and Balmorhea business routes of Interstate 10, RM 1312 between Ozona and Sonora, RM 3130 between Sonora and Roosevelt, and RM 1674 between Roosevelt and Junction.

=== Freeway upgrades ===
==== Austin ====
290 Toll Road
- Manor Expressway
- Location: Austin–Manor
- Existed: 2014–present

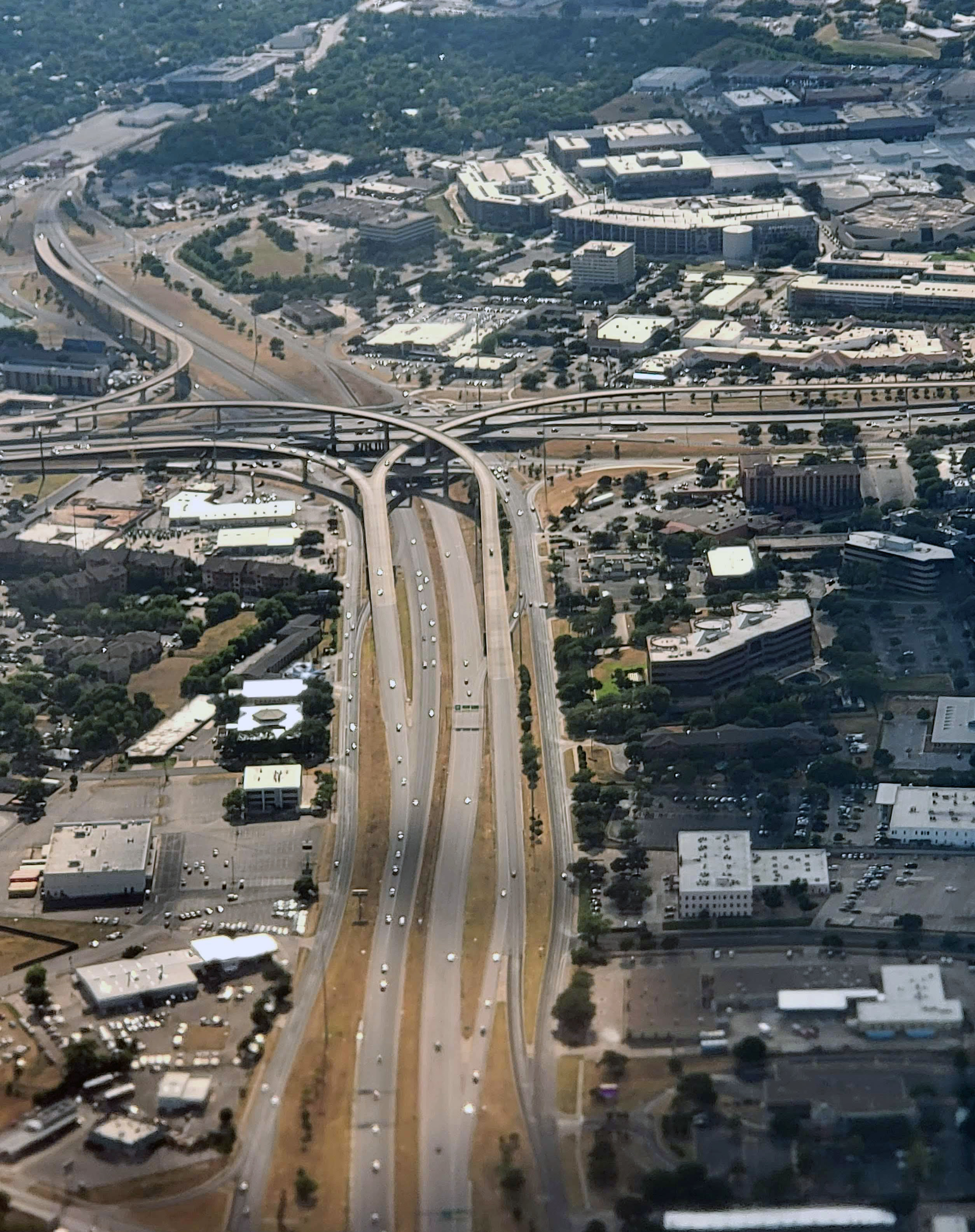
The I-35 and US 290 junction in Austin.

In Austin, US 290 initially received two different freeway upgrades; the first took place circa the 1970s from the north interchange with I-35 near Highland Mall to US 183 east of the Coronado Hills district, while the second took place in the late 1990s and early 2000s from the Williamson Creek crossing in the Oak Hill district to the south interchange with I-35 near St. Edward's University. In 2012, the Central Texas Regional Mobility Authority began constructing a third freeway upgrade from the existing interchange with US 183 to the crossing at Gilleland Creek west of Manor; this designation, known as the Manor Expressway, was completed on May 17, 2014.

==== Houston ====
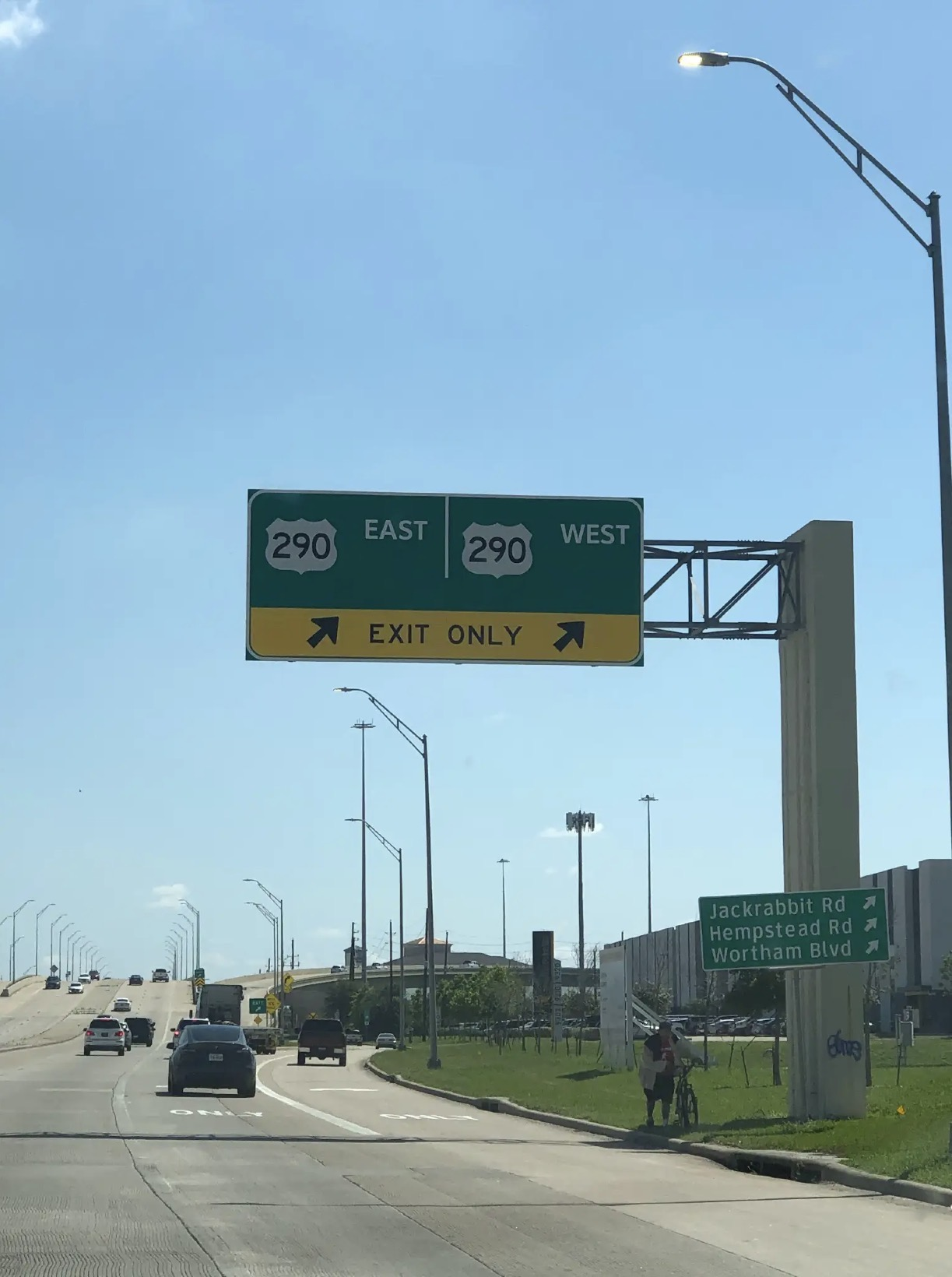
The US 290 and Texas State Highway 6 junction in Hempstead, Houston.

Prior to construction of the Northwest Freeway, US 290 through Houston followed Hempstead Highway, which runs parallel to the freeway approximately one-half mile to the southwest. The eastern terminus of US 290 was also approximately one mile to the southeast at the intersection of Hempstead Highway, Washington Avenue and Old Katy Road.

The interchange with I-610 and first part of frontage roads opened in 1963. The first freeway section opened in 1975. In 1982, freeway main lanes completed to just inside Beltway 8. In 1990, the stack interchange with Beltway 8 were completed. From 1984 to 2005, the main lanes outside Beltway 8 were completed.

The freeway was constructed to only three lanes in each direction, but a major investment study in 2002 requested expansion to five lanes in each direction inside Beltway 8 and four lanes in each direction from Beltway 8 to the then-proposed SH 99.

== Future ==
In 2011, two members of the U.S. House of Representatives, John Culberson and Michael T. McCaul, asked TxDOT to advocate for the relabeling of US 290 as an interstate highway.

Due to heavy congestion on US 290 in Austin's Oak Hill district, in 2022 CTRMA began upgrading US 290 to a freeway between the east intersection of Circle Drive and the existing end of the current freeway at Old Fredericksburg Road; this expansion is known as the Oak Hill Parkway.

In Houston, the Harris County Toll Road Authority is planning to construct toll managed lanes along and adjacent to the US 290 right-of-way, to be called the Hempstead Tollway.

== Major intersections ==
All exits are unnumbered.

County	Location	mi	km	Destinations	Notes
Kimble		0.000	0.000	I-10 – San Antonio, Junction	Western terminus; I-10 exit 477
Kimble		13.158	21.176	RM 479 to I-10 / FM 2169	
Kimble		14.192	22.840	RM 385 north to US 377	
Gillespie	Harper	17.692	28.473	RM 783 south – Kerrville	Western end of RM 783 concurrency
Gillespie	Harper	18.047	29.044	RM 783 north / FM 2093 east – Doss	Eastern end of RM 783 concurrency
Gillespie	Fredericksburg	39.935 586.230	64.269 943.446	US 87 north – Mason	Western end of US 87 concurrency; route follows US 87's mileage
Gillespie	Fredericksburg	586.962	944.624	RM 965 north (Milam Street) – Enchanted Rock, Cross Mountain	
Gillespie	Fredericksburg	587.356	945.258	SH 16 south (Adams Street) – Kerrville	Western end of SH 16 concurrency; access to Methodist Hospital Hill Country
Gillespie	Fredericksburg	587.488	945.470	SH 16 north (Llano Street) – Llano	Eastern end of SH 16 concurrency
Gillespie	Fredericksburg	587.746 41.437	945.885 66.686	US 87 south (Washington Street) – San Antonio	Eastern end of US 87 concurrency
Gillespie	Fredericksburg	41.973	67.549	RM 1631 east (Olive Street) – Cave Creek	
Gillespie		46.686	75.134	RM 1376 south – Boerne	
Gillespie	Stonewall	54.835	88.248	RR 1 east	
Gillespie	Stonewall	55.903	89.967	RM 1623 north	Western end of RM 1623 concurrency
Gillespie	Stonewall	56.144	90.355	RM 1623 east – Albert, Blanco	Eastern end of RM 1623 concurrency
Gillespie		57.581	92.668	PR 52 north – Lyndon B. Johnson State & National Historic Park	
Blanco		60.764	97.790	RR 1 west	
Blanco		62.612	100.764	RM 1320 north – Sandy	
Blanco	Johnson City	71.147	114.500	Spur 356 north (Nugent Avenue)	
Blanco	Johnson City	71.647 271.334	115.305 436.670	US 281 north – Marble Falls, Burnet	Western end of US 281 concurrency; route follows US 281's mileage
Blanco	Johnson City	271.516	436.963	RM 2766 east – Pedernales Falls State Park	
Blanco		276.852 77.139	445.550 124.143	US 281 south – San Antonio	Eastern end of US 281 concurrency
Blanco		86.173	138.682	RM 3232 north – Pedernales Falls State Park	
Hays	Henly	87.508	140.830	RM 165 west – Blanco	
Hays	Dripping Springs	95.729	154.061	RM 12 – Wimberley, San Marcos	
Travis	Austin			Circle Drive / South View Road	Indirect westbound exit and eastbound entrance (to be signed at Scenic Brook Drive); interchange expected to open in 2026
Travis	Austin			Scenic Brook Drive	Interchange expected to open in 2026
Travis	Austin	108.502	174.617	RM 1826 south – Driftwood, Wildflower Center	Access to Seton Southwest Hospital; interchange expected to open in 2026
Travis	Austin			Convict Hill Road	Interchange expected to open in 2026
Travis	Austin	109.393	176.051	SH 71 west – Lake Travis, Llano	Western end of SH 71 concurrency; interchange expected to open in 2026
Travis	Austin			William Cannon Drive	Interchange expected to open in 2026
Travis	Austin	110.478– 111.146	177.797– 178.872	Old Fredericksburg Road / Harper Park Drive	Interchange; western end of freeway; no direct westbound exit
Travis	Austin	111.143– 112.454	178.867– 180.977	Monterey Oaks Boulevard / Industrial Oaks Boulevard	
Travis	Austin	112.001– 113.658	180.248– 182.915	Loop 1 (MoPac Expressway) / Brodie Lane / Southwest Parkway	Access to Baylor Scott & White Medical Center – Austin
Travis	Austin	112.837– 114.175	181.594– 183.747	West Gate Boulevard	No direct westbound exit (signed at Loop 343)
Travis	Austin	113.770– 114.377	183.095– 184.072	Loop 343 (Lamar Boulevard) / Loop 360 (Capital of Texas Highway)	
Travis	Austin	112.837– 115.195	181.594– 185.388	Victory Drive / Pack Saddle Pass / Menchaca Road	No direct eastbound exit (signed at Loop 343)
Travis	Austin	112.837– 116.399	181.594– 187.326	Banister Lane / South 1st Street	Access to South Austin Medical Center
Travis	Austin	115.999– 117.064	186.682– 188.396	Loop 275 (Congress Avenue)	Eastbound exit and westbound entrance
Travis	Austin	117.175 230.141	188.575 370.376	I-35 south / SH 71 east – San Antonio, Bastrop, Austin-Bergstrom International Airport	Eastern end of SH 71 concurrency; western end of I-35 concurrency; US 290 west follows exit 230
Travis	Austin	see I-35			
Travis	Austin	125.539– 125.805	202.035– 202.464	I-35 north / RM 2222 west (via Spur 69) – Waco	Eastern end of I-35 concurrency; US 290 east follows exit 238B
Travis	Austin	125.867– 127.046	202.563– 204.461	Cameron Road / Berkman Drive	Eastbound exit for Berkman Drive only
Travis	Austin	126.295– 127.494	203.252– 205.182	US 183 (Anderson Lane / Ed Bluestein Boulevard) to 183 Toll Road (Bergstrom Expressway) – Lampasas, Lockhart, Austin-Bergstrom International Airport	
Travis	Austin	127.312– 128.275	204.889– 206.439	290 Toll Road begins / Tuscany Way / Springdale Road	Last free eastbound exit; western end of 290 Toll Road
Travis	Austin	128.573– 129.067	206.918– 207.713	290 Toll Road / Arterial A	Access point
Travis	Austin	129.542– 130.178	208.478– 209.501	290 Toll Road / Giles Lane / Johnny Morris Road	Access point
Travis	Austin	130.598– 131.166	210.177– 211.091	290 Toll Road / FM 3177 (Decker Lane) / Harris Branch Parkway	Access point
Travis	Austin	131.784– 132.493	212.086– 213.227	SH 45 Toll / SH 130 Toll / 290 Toll Road – Waco, San Antonio	SH 130 exit 437
Travis	Austin	132.900	213.882	FM 734 west (Parmer Lane)	Last free westbound exit before start of 290 Toll Road
Travis	Manor	133.411	214.704	290 Toll Road ends	Eastern end of 290 Toll Road
Travis	Manor	134.394	216.286	Loop 212 (Murray Avenue)	
Travis	Manor	135.402– 135.474	217.908– 218.024	FM 973 / Loop 212 – Taylor, Manor	
Travis		138.684	223.190	FM 1100 east – Kimbro	
Bastrop	Elgin	144.420– 144.579	232.421– 232.677	SH 95 north – Coupland, Taylor	Western end of SH 95 concurrency
Bastrop	Elgin	145.858– 145.902	234.736– 234.807	Loop 109 north to FM 1704 – Historical District	
Bastrop	Elgin	146.388– 146.425	235.589– 235.648	SH 95 south – Bastrop	Eastern end of SH 95 concurrency
Bastrop		150.247	241.799	FM 696 east – Lexington	
Bastrop	McDade	154.393	248.471	Loop 223 (Waco Street) – McDade	
Bastrop	McDade	154.781	249.096	Loop 223 south (Columbus Street) / FM 2336 – McDade, Swiftex	
Bastrop	Paige	162.394– 162.848	261.348– 262.078	SH 21 – Bryan, Bastrop, San Marcos, Caldwell	Interchange
Bastrop	Paige	164.351	264.497	Spur 186 (Gonzales Street)	
Bastrop		164.664	265.001	FM 2104 south – Serbin, Smithville	
Lee	Giddings	175.438	282.340	US 77 (Main Street)	
Lee	Giddings	175.877	283.047	FM 141 north (Orange Street) – Dime Box	
Lee		182.261	293.321	FM 180 north – Nails Creek State Park	
Fayette	Ledbetter	184.462	296.863	FM 1291 south – Fayetteville	
Fayette	Carmine	190.899	307.222	Spur 458 south – Round Top	
Washington		194.145– 194.637	312.446– 313.238	SH 237 south – Roundtop, La Grange	Interchange
Washington		195.449	314.545	FM 2502 south – Greenvine	
Washington	Burton	196.592	316.384	FM 390 east – Burton	
Washington		197.590	317.990	Spur 125 west – Burton, Cotton Gin Museum	
Washington		199.990	321.853	FM 1948 north	
Washington		204.659	329.367	FM 2679 north – Zionsville	
Washington	Brenham	208.134– 208.463	334.959– 335.489	Bus. US 290 east / SH 36 north – Brenham, Somerville	Western end of SH 36 concurrency; western end of freeway; interchange
Washington	Brenham	208.717	335.897	Old Mill Creek Road	
Washington	Brenham	208.910– 209.369	336.208– 336.947	FM 389 (Prairie Lea Street) – Blinn College, Industrial Park	
Washington	Brenham	210.021	337.996	Lubbock Street / Industrial Boulevard	Westbound exit and eastbound entrance
Washington	Brenham	209.602– 211.728	337.322– 340.743	SH 36 south / Bus. SH 36 north (Day Street) – Bellville	Eastern end of SH 36 concurrency; access to Baylor Scott & White Medical Center - Brenham
Washington	Brenham	210.486– 212.406	338.744– 341.834	Bus. US 290 west / FM 577 (Gun & Rod Road)	Interchange; eastern end of freeway
Washington		217.205	349.558	FM 2447 east	
Washington		218.351	351.402	FM 1371 south	
Washington		218.782	352.095	FM 1155 – Washington	
Washington		219.859	353.829	FM 1371 south	
Waller		228.701	368.059	FM 1736 east	
Waller	Hempstead	229.596– 230.474	369.499– 370.912	SH 6 north (US 290 Bus. east) – College Station, Bryan, Hempstead	Western end of SH 6 concurrency; western end of freeway; hybrid interchange
Waller	Hempstead	231.308– 232.181	372.254– 373.659	FM 1488 – Hempstead, Magnolia	
Waller		232.754	374.581	FM 359 – Brookshire	No direct eastbound exit (signed at FM 1488)
Waller	Prairie View	233.966– 234.648	376.532– 377.629	Liendo Parkway	
Waller	Prairie View			Richards Road	
Waller	Prairie View	235.816– 236.026	379.509– 379.847	FM 1098 (Sandra Bland Parkway) – Prairie View	
Waller		237.181– 237.943	381.706– 382.932	James Muse Parkway	
Waller		238.786– 239.469	384.289– 385.388	FM 362	
Harris	Waller	239.543– 240.721	385.507– 387.403	Field Store Road	
Harris	Waller	240.959– 241.149	387.786– 388.092	FM 2920 – Waller, Tomball, Klein, Spring	
Harris	Waller	241.628– 242.214	388.863– 389.806	Binford Road	
Harris	Hockley	242.799– 243.499	390.747– 391.874	Kickapoo Road	
Harris	Hockley	244.031– 244.656	392.730– 393.736	Kermier Road	
Harris	Hockley	245.355– 246.137	394.861– 396.119	Hegar Road	
Harris		246.372– 247.107	396.497– 397.680	Badtke Road / Betka Road	Betka Road unsigned
Harris		247.325– 248.241	398.031– 399.505	Roberts Road / Katy Hockley Road	
Harris		248.472– 248.884	399.877– 400.540	Becker Road	
Harris		249.125– 250.669	400.928– 403.413	Bauer Road	No direct westbound entrance
Harris		249.753– 251.309	401.938– 404.443	SH 99 Toll (Grand Parkway)	Interchange
Harris	Cypress	250.538– 252.388	403.202– 406.179	Fairfield Place Drive	Westbound access only; no eastbound exit or entrance
Harris	Cypress	251.726– 253.146	405.114– 407.399	Mason Road	Western end of reversible HOV/toll lane
Harris	Cypress	253.269– 254.166	407.597– 409.041	Mueschke Road	
Harris	Cypress	254.442– 256.260	409.485– 412.410	Cypress-Rose Hill Road / Fry Road / Spring-Cypress Road	
Harris	Cypress	255.761– 257.702	411.607– 414.731	Skinner Road	Signed with Barker-Cypress Road westbound
Harris		256.698– 258.793	413.115– 416.487	Barker-Cypress Road	
Harris		258.031– 259.996	415.261– 418.423	Telge Road	
Harris		259.049– 261.596	416.899– 420.998	Hempstead Road / Huffmeister Road	Access to North Cypress Medical Center; Hempstead Road not signed westbound
Harris	Jersey Village	260.403	419.078	290 Express Lane	
Harris	Jersey Village	261.148– 262.531	420.277– 422.503	SH 6 south / FM 1960 east	Eastern end of SH 6 concurrency; access to Cypress Fairbanks Medical Center
Harris	Jersey Village	262.132– 263.272	421.861– 423.695	Eldridge Parkway / West Road	
Harris	Jersey Village	263.120	423.451	NW Station Park & Ride	
Harris	Jersey Village	264.086– 264.954	425.005– 426.402	Jones Road	
Harris	Jersey Village			FM 529 / Senate Avenue	
Harris	Jersey Village	264.321– 267.251	425.383– 430.099	Beltway 8 (Frontage Road)	Beltway 8 signed at FM 529/Senate Avenue eastbound and Little York Road/Gessner Road westbound
Harris	Jersey Village			Sam Houston Tollway	Interchange
Harris	Houston	265.272– 265.524	426.914– 427.319	Little York Road / Gessner Road	
Harris	Houston	266.408	428.742	West Little York Park & Ride	Interchange for 290 Express Lane
Harris	Houston	267.776– 268.984	430.944– 432.888	Fairbanks-North Houston Road	
Harris	Houston	269.347– 270.747	433.472– 435.725	Tidwell Road / Hollister Road	
Harris	Houston	270.195– 272.467	434.837– 438.493	Pinemont Drive / Bingle Road / 43rd Street	Separate exits for West 43rd and Bingle/Pinemont westbound, opened in October 2017
Harris	Houston	271.927– 273.748	437.624– 440.555	Antoine Drive / 34th Street	
Harris	Houston	273.404	440.001	I-10 (US 90) – San Antonio, Downtown	I-10 exit 763; I-610 exit 11; eastbound exit only
Harris	Houston	273.228– 274.185	439.718– 441.258	Mangum Road / Dacoma Street / 18th Street / Hempstead Road	No eastbound entrance
Harris	Houston			I-10 east / Hempstead Road/Katy Road – NW Transit Center, Downtown	Eastbound exit for 290 Express Lane; eastern end of HOV/toll lanes at I-10, exit 763
Harris	Houston	274.372	441.559	I-610	Eastern terminus; I-610 exit 13A; redesigned tri-stack interchange
1.000 mi = 1.609 km; 1.000 km = 0.621 mi: Closed/former; Concurrency terminus; Electronic toll collection; HOV only; Incomplete access

== Business routes ==
US 290 currently has three business routes and one former loop.

=== Dripping Springs business loop ===
State Highway Loop 64
- Location: Dripping Springs
- Length: 0.55 mi (890 m)
- Existed: September 1, 1958–June 27, 2003

Loop 64 is a former business loop of US 290 through the town of Dripping Springs. The highway was designated in 1958 along the former route of US 290 through the town along Mercer Street when the main highway was re-routed two blocks to the south. Loop 64 was removed from the state highway system in 2003 and returned to the city of Dripping Springs for maintenance.

The Loop 64 designation was previously used for a highway in Henderson County. This Loop 64 was designated in 1939, running from SH 31 southeast to a point on the St. Louis Southwestern Railroad in Trinidad. The highway was cancelled and combined with FM 764 in 1948.

=== Brenham business loop ===
Business U.S. Highway 290-F
- Location: Brenham
- Length: 4.590 mi (7.387 km)
- Existed: 1990–present

Business U.S. Highway 290-F (Bus. US 290) is the original routing of US 290 through the town of Brenham. The route is 4.59 miles (7.39 km) in length. The route was designated as Loop 318 throughout its entire length on January 18, 1960. On February 28, 1973, the section from then-SH 90 westward became part of SH 105. It was established in 1990 when the mainline of US 290 was rerouted along with SH 36 around the western and southern sides of Brenham. The routing begins to the west of town at an intersection with SH 36. The business route continues east into downtown on Main Street. Before reaching downtown, the route splits into two parallel one-way streets: Main Street carrying westbound traffic and Alamo Street carrying eastbound traffic. It passes through downtown, meeting the business routing of State Highway 36 and the western terminus of SH 105. At this intersection, the business route turns south on Market Street, and continues out of Brenham, rejoining the mainline US 290 near an intersection with FM 577.

=== Hempstead–Hockley business loop ===
Business U.S. Highway 290-H
- Location: Hempstead–Hockley
- Length: 16.991 mi (27.344 km)
- Existed: 1995–present

Business U.S. Highway 290-H (Bus. US 290) is the original routing of US 290 through the towns of Hempstead, Waller, and Hockley. This route was designated between 1995 and 1998 in stages as a limited-access bypass route was constructed to the north of these towns. It begins at the interchange with US 290 and SH 6 and travels south into Hempstead along 10th Street. At an intersection with SH 159, the business route turns east onto Austin Street and subsequently runs parallel to the adjacent railroad after leaving Hempstead city limits. It intersects several amenities in Prairie View before serving downtown Waller while designated as Hempstead Road. After passing through several industrial facilities and serving downtown Hockley, the business route becomes US 290's southbound frontage road just prior to the interchange with Badtke Road.

=== Cypress business loop ===
Business U.S. Highway 290-L
- Location: Cypress
- Length: 1.396 mi (2.247 km)
- Existed: 1993–present

Business U.S. Highway 290-L (Bus. US 290) is the original routing of US 290 through the town of Cypress. The route was designated in 1993 as a limited-access bypass was built to the northeast of the original routing. At roughly 1.3 miles (2.1 km), it is US 290's shortest designated business route, serving the south side of Cypress's shopping area near the Fry Road and Spring Cypress Road interchanges.

==== Former Austin business loop ====
Business U.S. Highway 290
- Location: Austin
- Existed: 1961–1970s

== See also ==
- List of United States Numbered Highways
- List of U.S. Highways in Texas
- List of special routes of the United States Numbered Highway System
