= Lyndon B. Johnson National Historical Park =

Historic district in Texas, U.S.

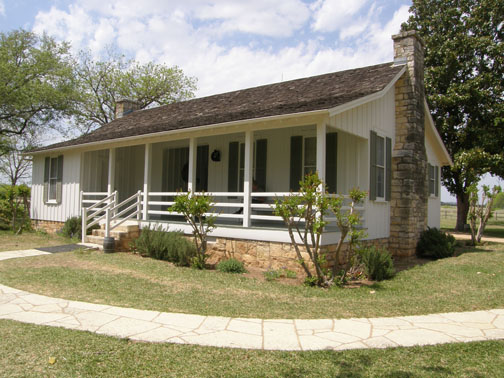
- President Johnson's birthplace in Gillespie County

- Location within Texas Location within the United States
- Location: Blanco and Gillespie County, Texas, U.S.
- Nearest city: Johnson City, Texas; Stonewall, Texas
- Coordinates: 30°14′27″N 98°37′27″W
- Area: 1,571 acres (6.36 km^{2})
- Established: December 2, 1969
- Visitors: 119,278 (in 2024)
- Governing body: National Park Service
- Website: www.nps.gov/lyjo
- Lyndon B. Johnson National Historical Park
- U.S. National Register of Historic Places
- U.S. Historic district
- U.S. National Historic Landmark
- Recorded Texas Historic Landmark
- Area: 1,571 acres (636 ha)
- Built: 1914
- NRHP reference No.: 69000202
- RTHL No.: Birthplace: 10062; Boyhood home: 2828

Significant dates
- Added to NRHP: December 2, 1969
- Designated NHL: May 23, 1966
- Designated RTHL: Birthplace: 1967; Boyhood home: 1965

Lyndon B. Johnson National Historical Park is a United States National Historical Park in central Texas about 50 miles (80 km) west of Austin in the Texas Hill Country. The park protects the birthplace, home, ranch, and grave of Lyndon B. Johnson, 36th president of the United States. During Johnson's administration, the LBJ Ranch was known as the Texas White House because the President spent approximately 20% of his time in office there. It was equipped with all the communication technology necessary for Johnson to carry out his duties. Johnson donated the ranch in his will to the public to form the park, with the provision that it "remain a working ranch and not become a sterile relic of the past". Following Lyndon's death, it was one of a number of residences owned and used by former First Lady Lady Bird Johnson prior to her death in 2007.

== Districts and features ==
The park consists of two discontiguous areas, the Johnson City District and the LBJ Ranch District. The Johnson City District, located in Johnson City, contains the boyhood home of President Johnson and his grandparents' log cabin settlement, as well as the National Park Visitor Center. The LBJ Ranch District is located roughly 14 miles (23 km) west of Johnson City along the north side of the Pedernales River in Gillespie County. The ranch was the Johnson family retreat during his period of greatest influence, and is the site of the family cemetery. This gives the visitors a perspective of President Johnson's life when he was in office.

=== Johnson City ===
The Johnson City Unit is located on the south side of the city, with parking areas at the visitor center on Lady Bird Lane, and on United States Route 290 at N Street. The visitor center, located in a former hospital, provides an introduction to the park, exhibits and films about President Johnson and his wife Lady Bird. A short way north of the visitor center is the Johnson Boyhood Home, an 1880s Victorian Era house where he lived with his parents from age five. This house, restored by Johnson while he was president, was designated a National Historic Landmark in 1965. West of the visitor center is the Johnson Settlement, a restored prairie in which are found the dogtrot house of Johnson's grandfather, and other 19th-century agricultural buildings.

=== LBJ Ranch ===
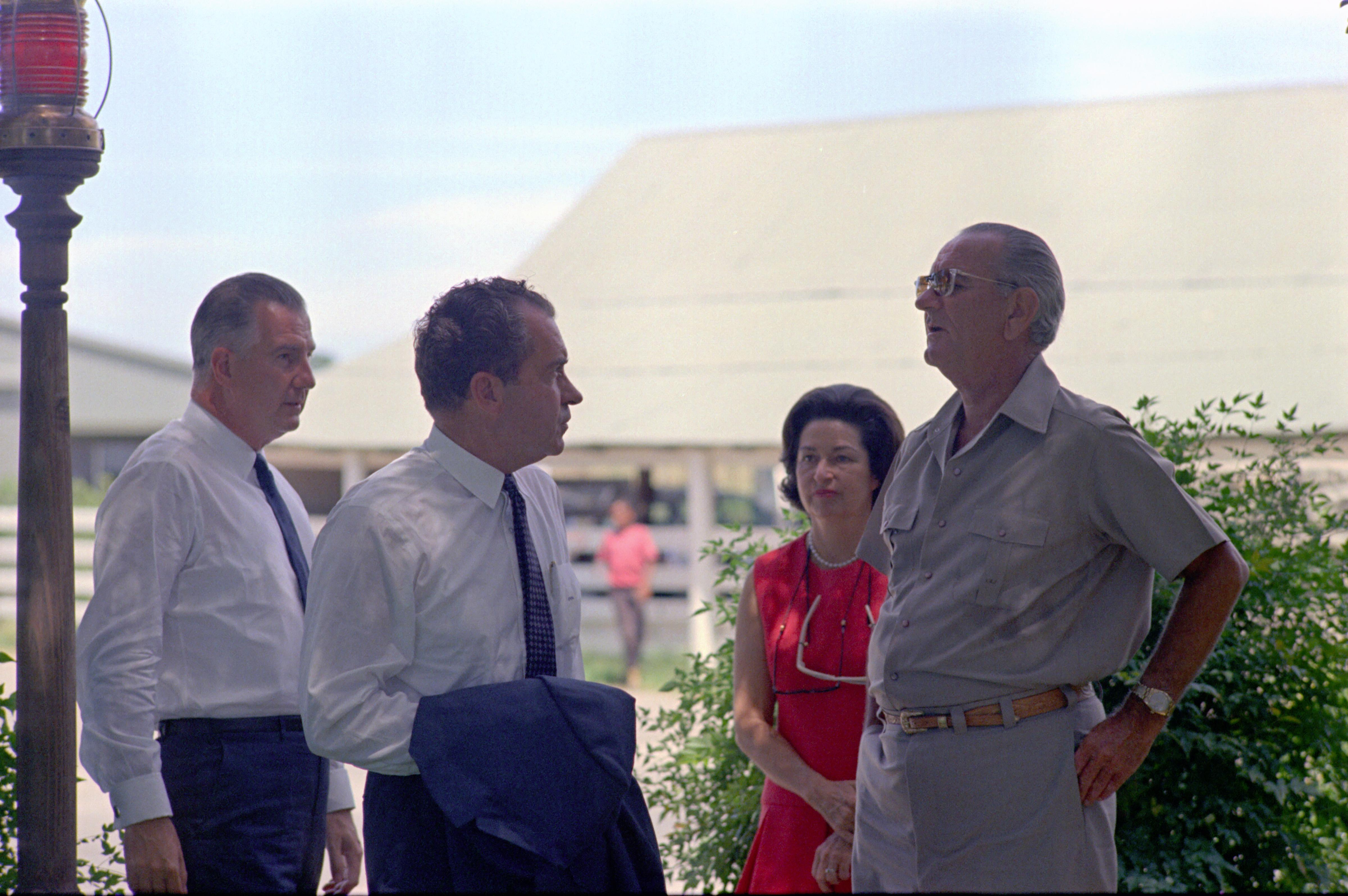
President Johnson and his wife Lady Bird greet Republicans Richard Nixon and Spiro Agnew, the 1968 Republican Party presidential and vice-presidential nominees, at the LBJ Ranch in August 1968.

The ranch is located on the north side of United States Route 290, about fourteen miles west of Johnson City, with its main access through the Lyndon B. Johnson State Park and Historic Site, which lies between the highway and the south bank of the Pedernales River. The National Park Service lands lie north of the river. Among the sites preserved at the Ranch are the President's first school, his reconstructed birthplace, the Texas White House, and the Johnson Family Cemetery, where both President and Lady Bird Johnson are buried. Visitors take a self-guided auto driving tour from State Park visitor center; a permit is required. Unusually for a Presidential residence, but per Lyndon Johnson's instructions, the ranch includes a herd of Hereford cattle, descended from cattle owned by Johnson.

On August 2, 2018, the National Park Service announced that the Texas White House and Pool House were temporarily closed to visitors due to structural issues and as of 2026 the house and pool house are still not open for tours.

== History ==
The park was authorized on December 2, 1969, as Lyndon B. Johnson National Historic Site and was redesignated as a National Historical Park on December 28, 1980. Present holdings are approximately 1,570 acres (6.4 km^{2}), 674 acres (2.7 km^{2}) of which are federal. The Johnson family continues to donate land to this property; their most recent gift was in April 1995.

== Gallery ==
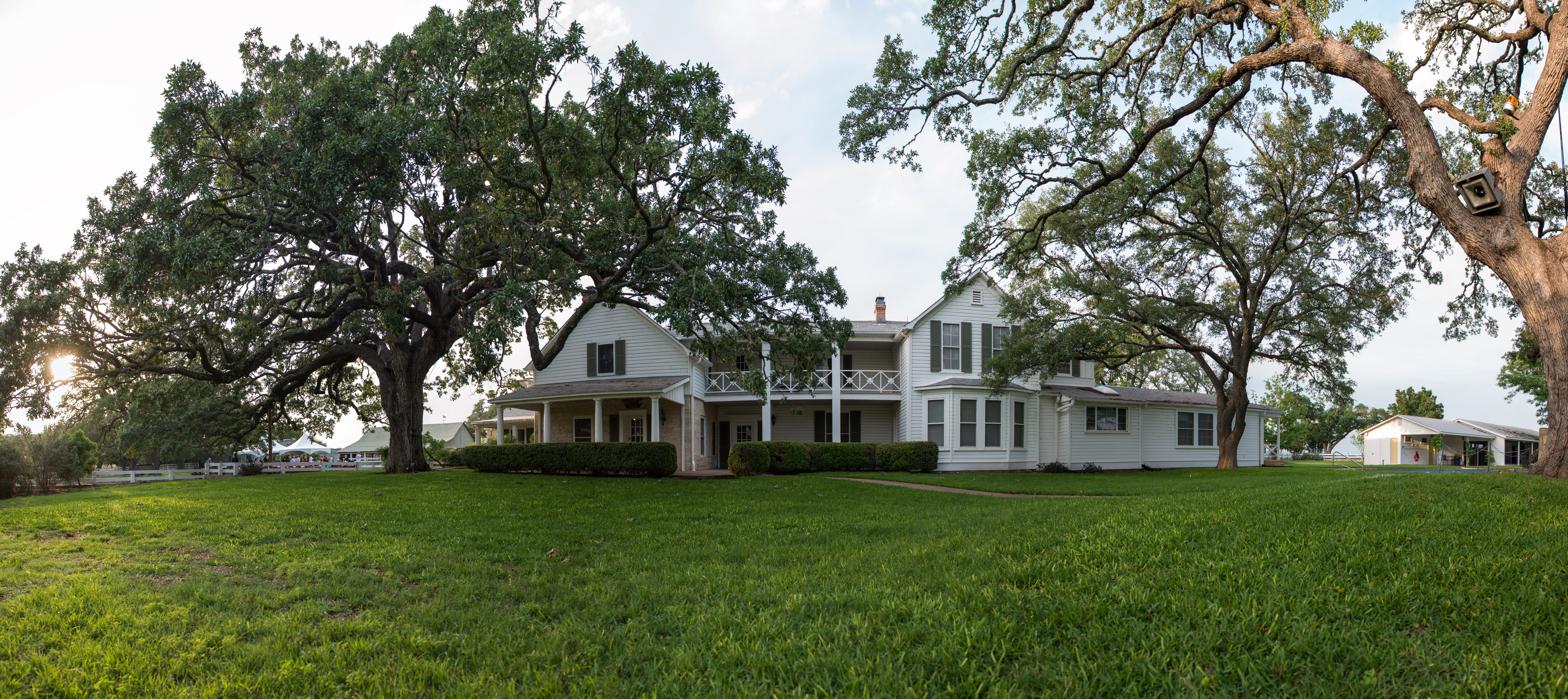
LBJ State Park and Historic Area is separated by the Pedernales River from the Lyndon B. Johnson National Historical Park.

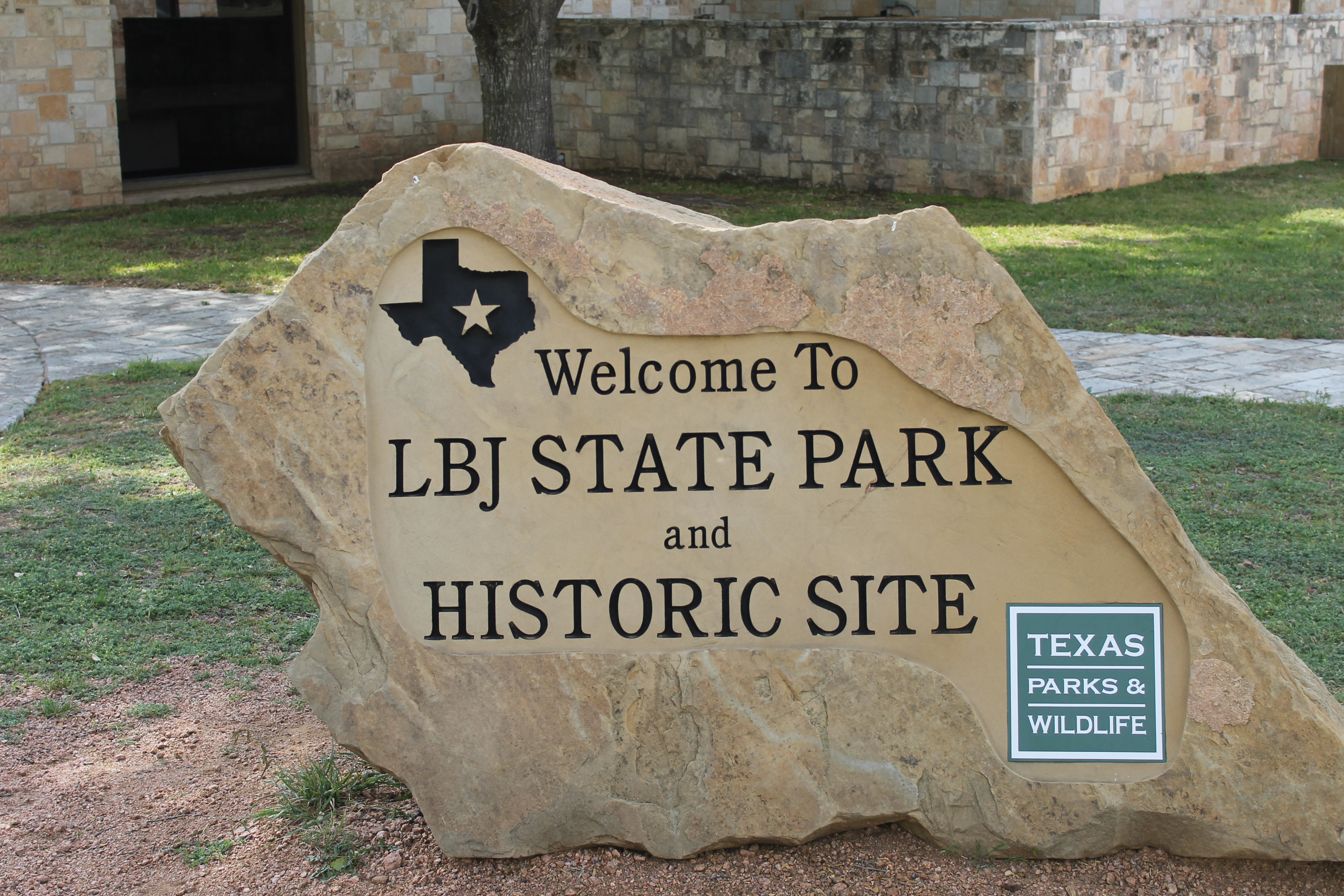
LBJ State Park and Historic Area is separated by the Pedernales River from the Lyndon B. Johnson National Historical Park.

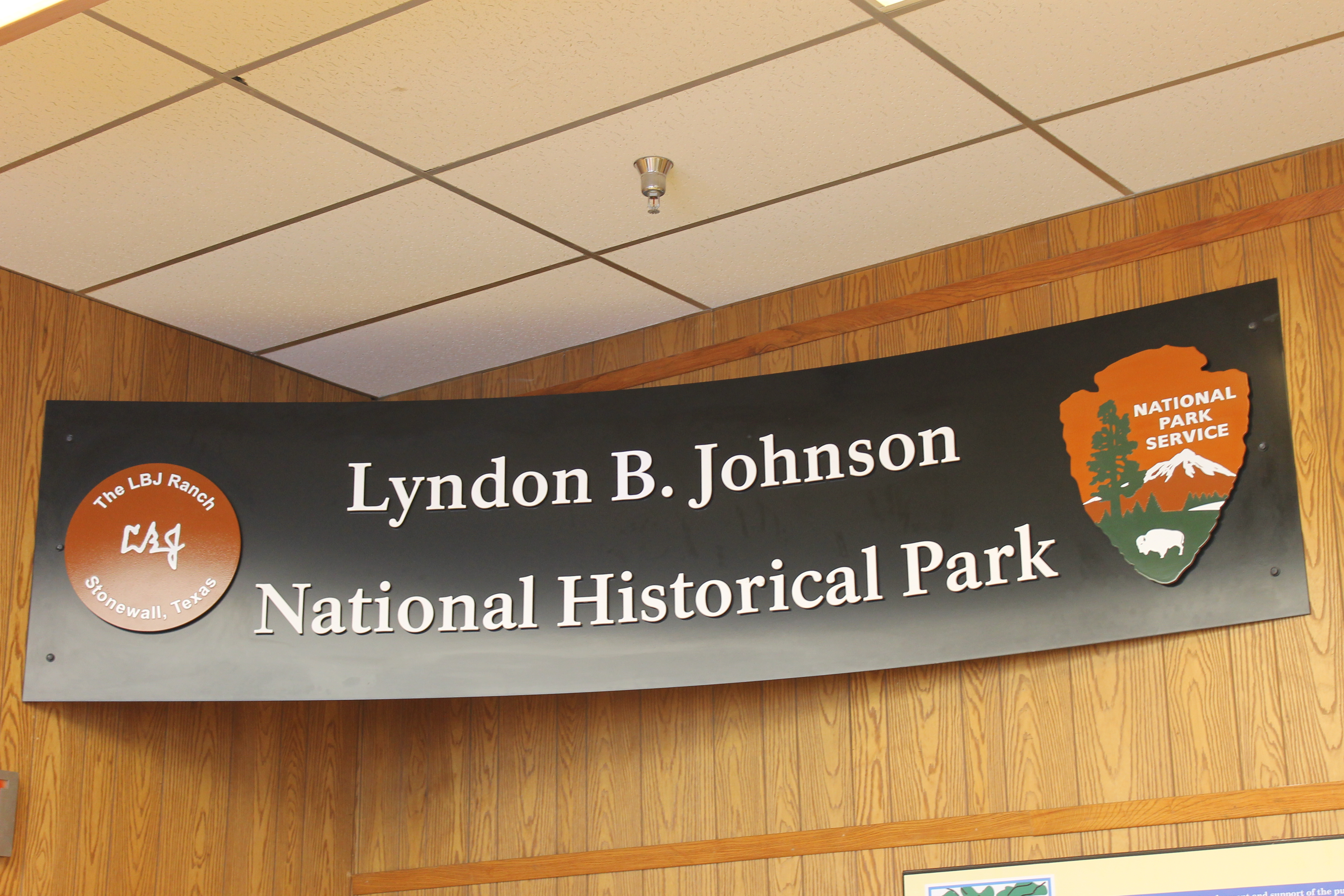
Sign at entrance to Johnson National Historical Park

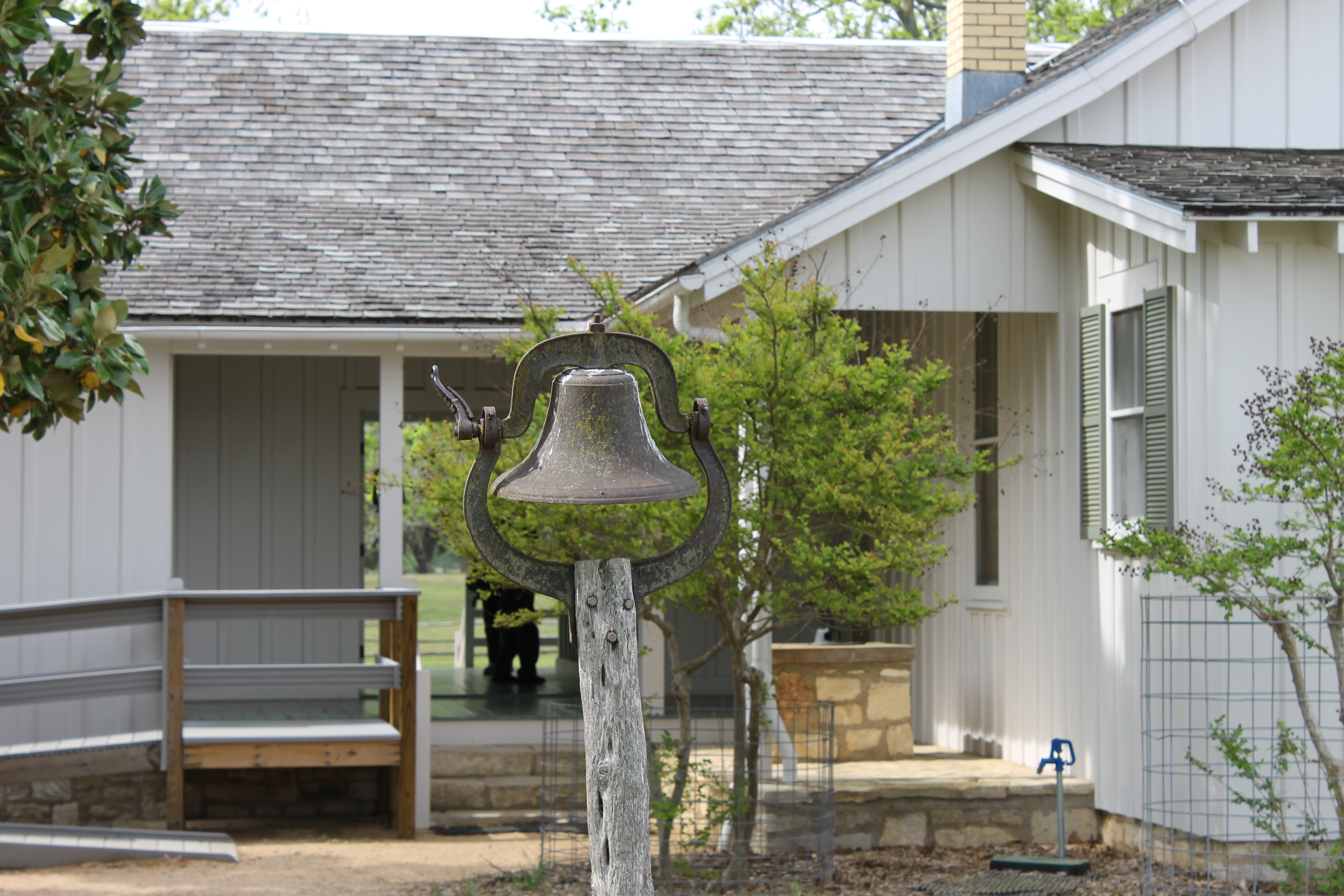
Rear view of President Johnson birthplace

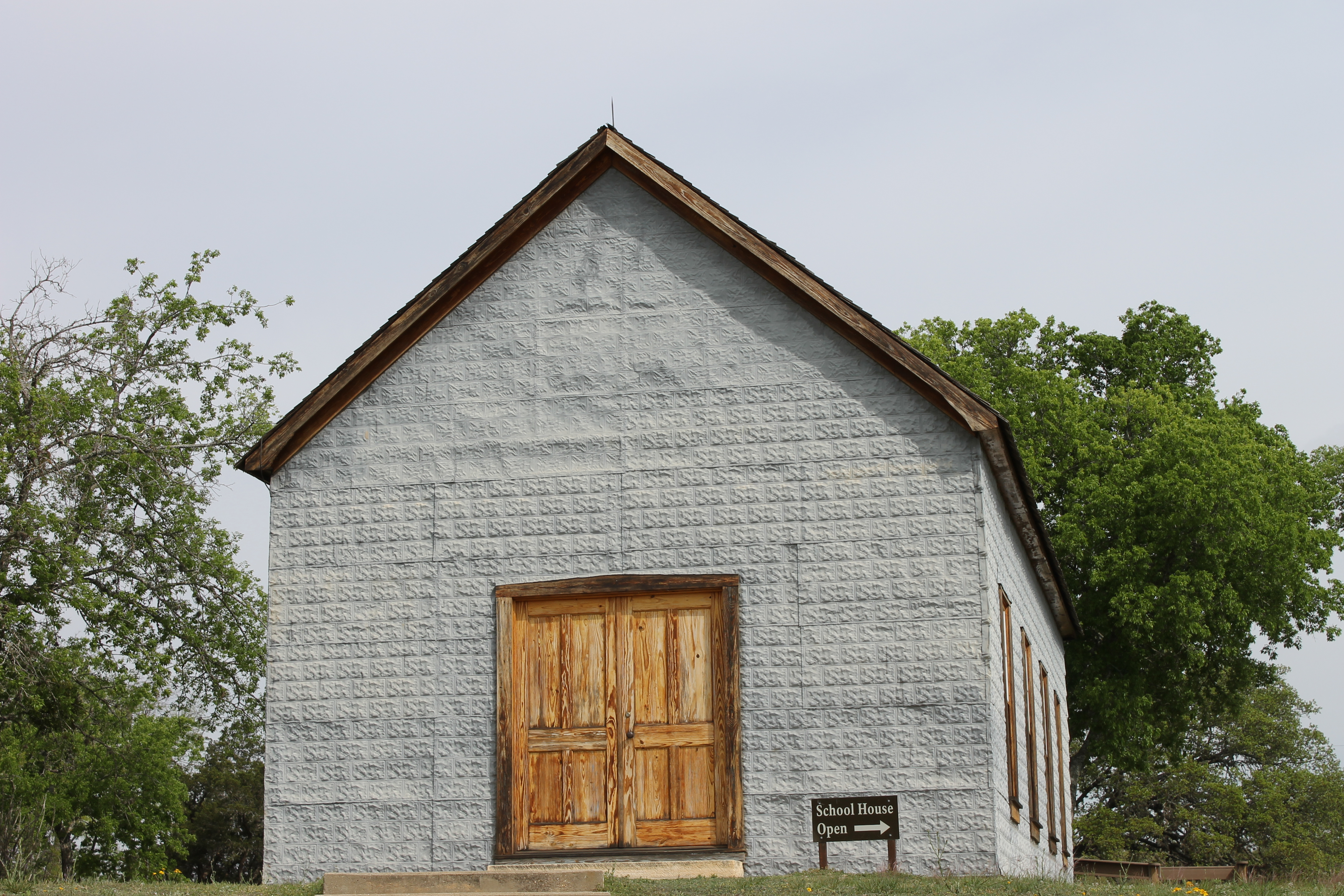
Young Johnson briefly attended this former one-room school c. 1914.

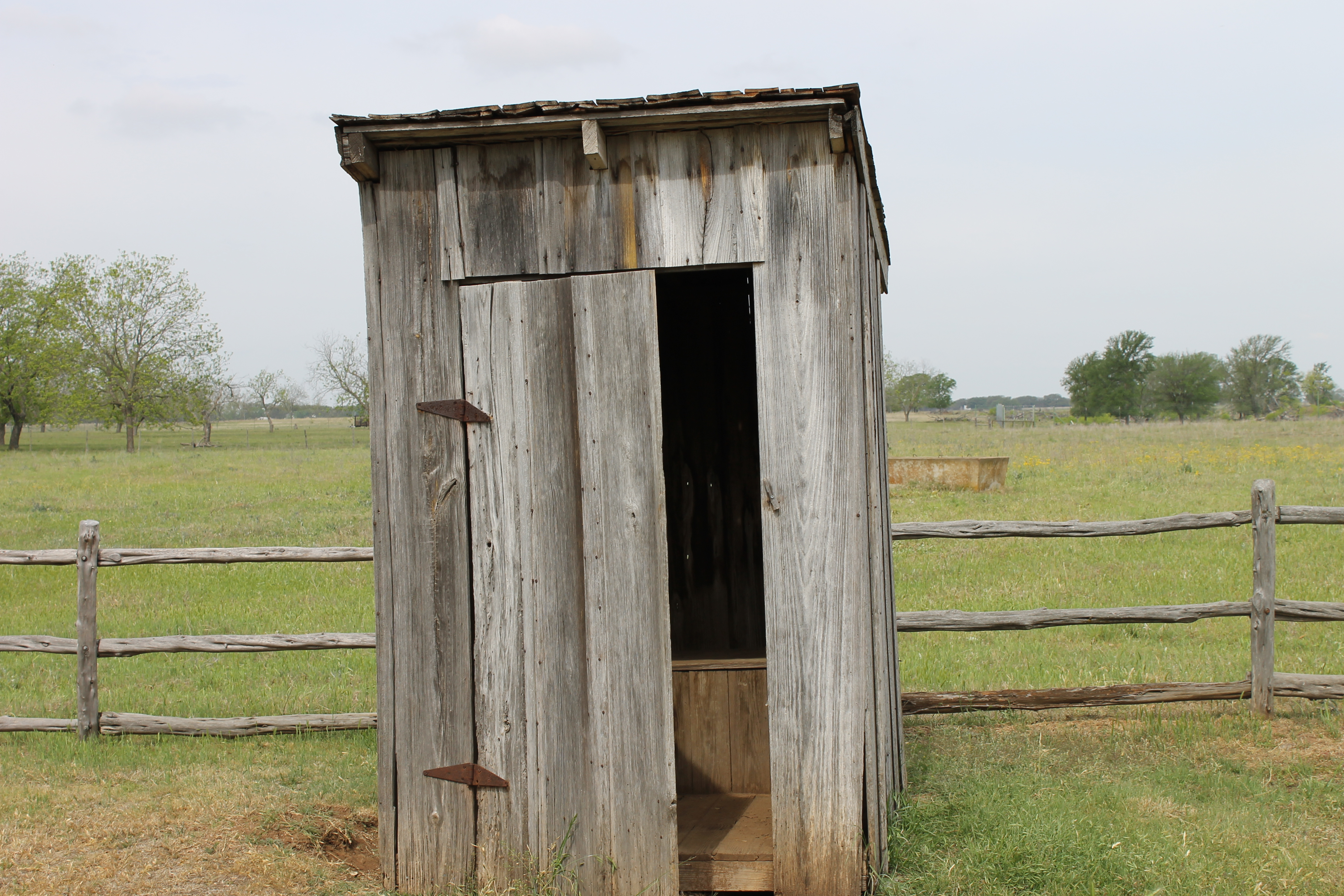
Outhouse at Johnson birthplace

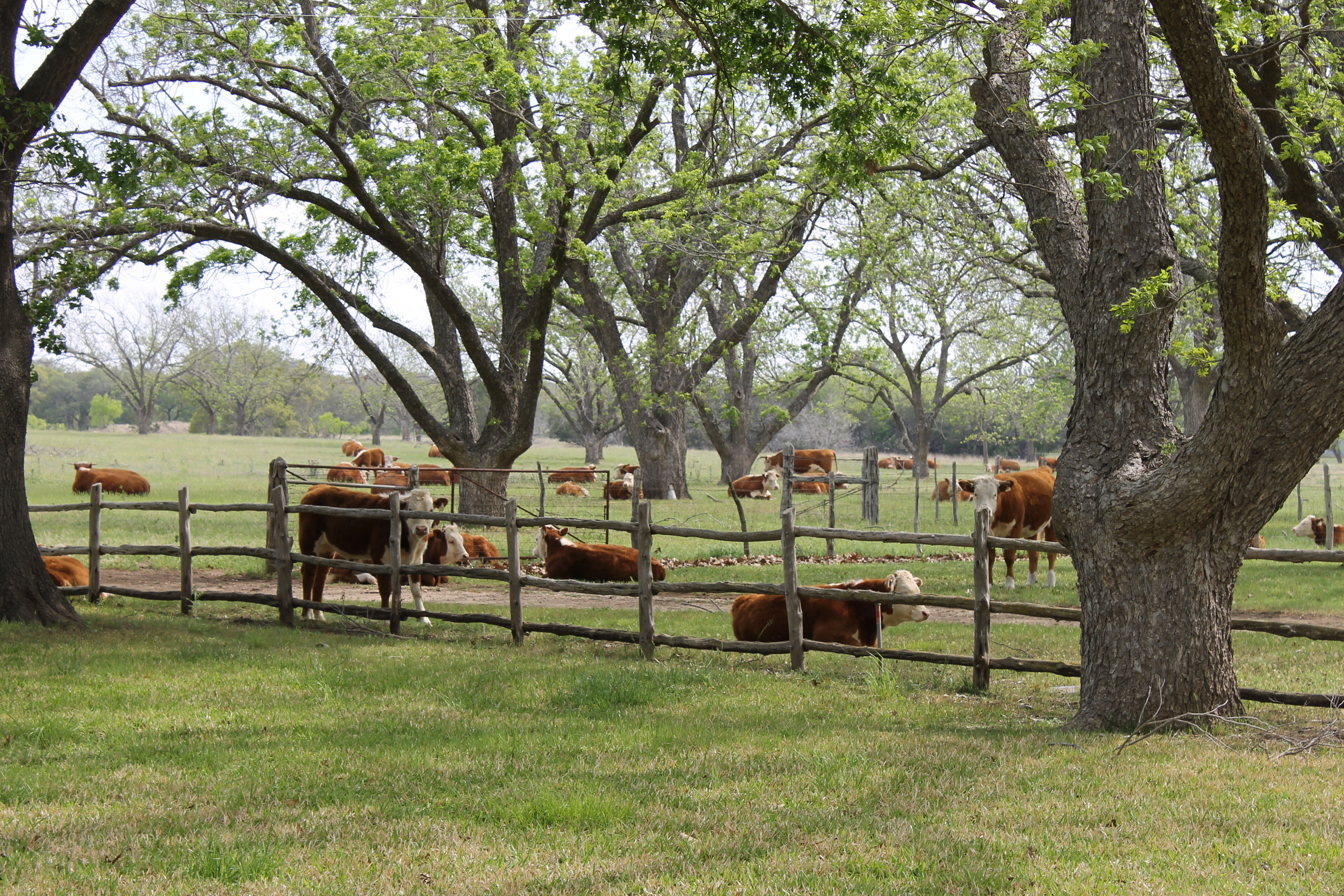
Cattle in the park are descended from former livestock of President Johnson.

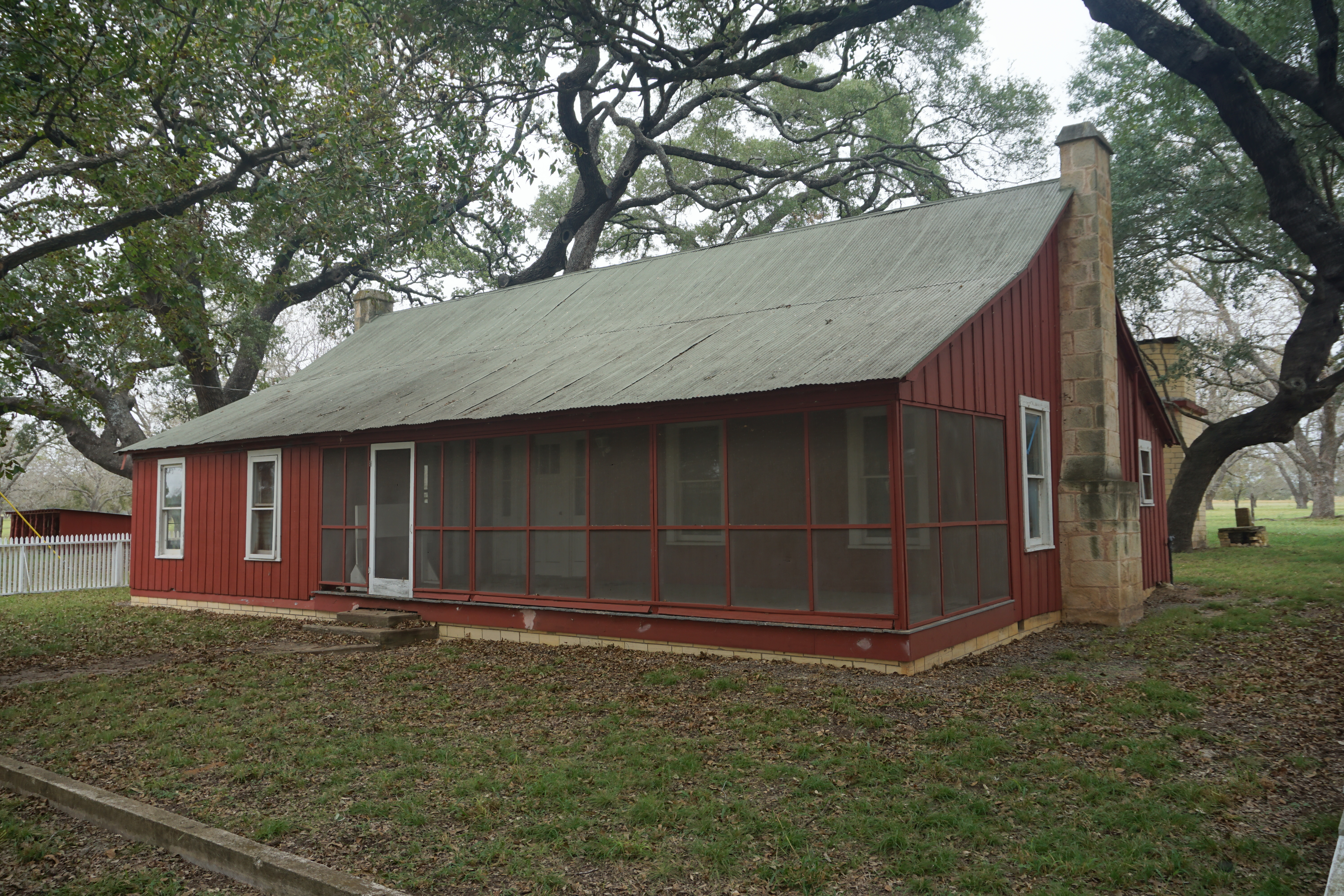
Farmhouse of Samuel Ealy Johnson, Sr., the grandfather of President Johnson; he died when Lyndon was six years old.

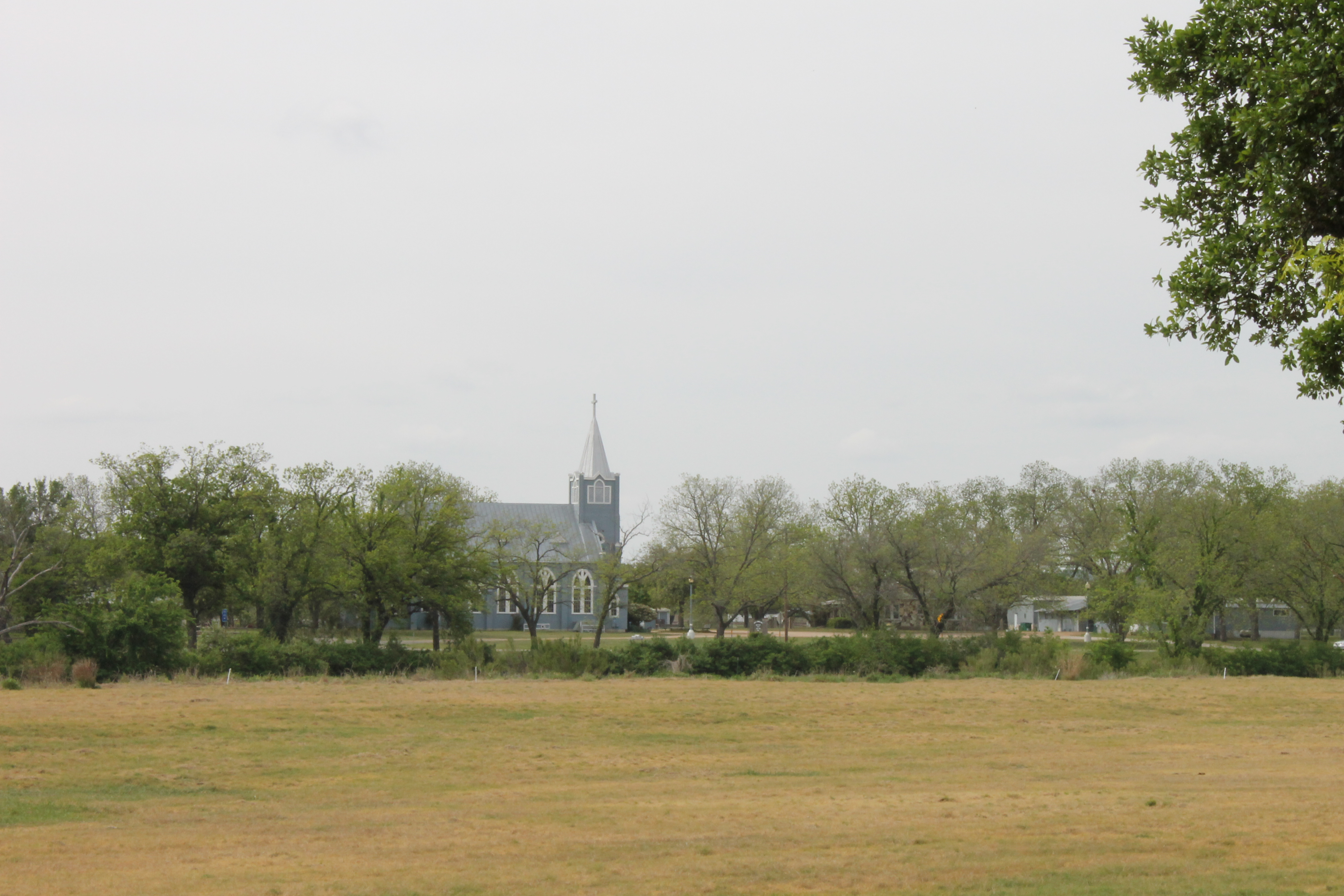
Though he was affiliated with the Disciples of Christ denomination, President Johnson often worshipped while at his ranch at the Trinity Lutheran Church (shown in the background).

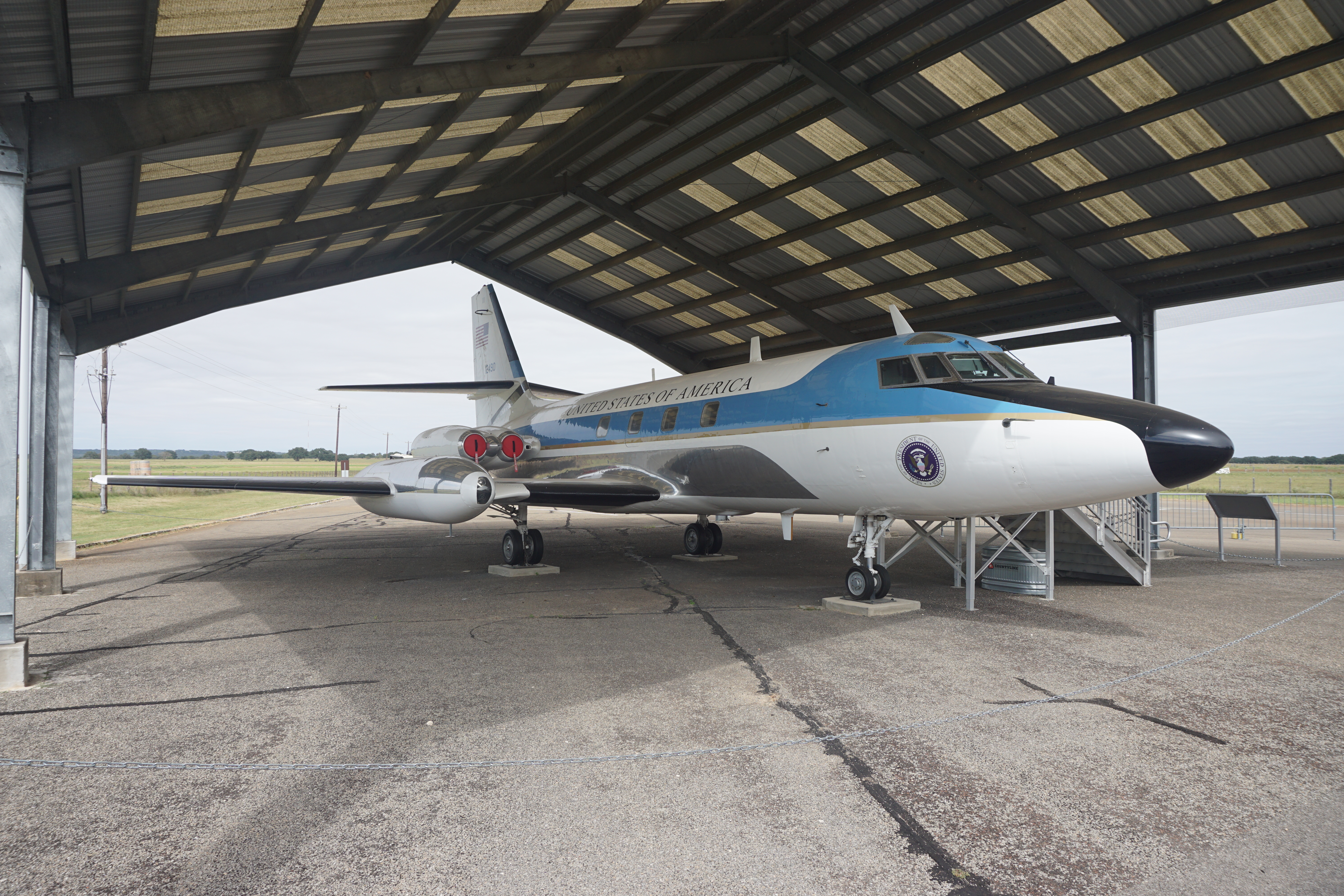
Air Force One used to bring Lyndon Johnson to the Texas White House

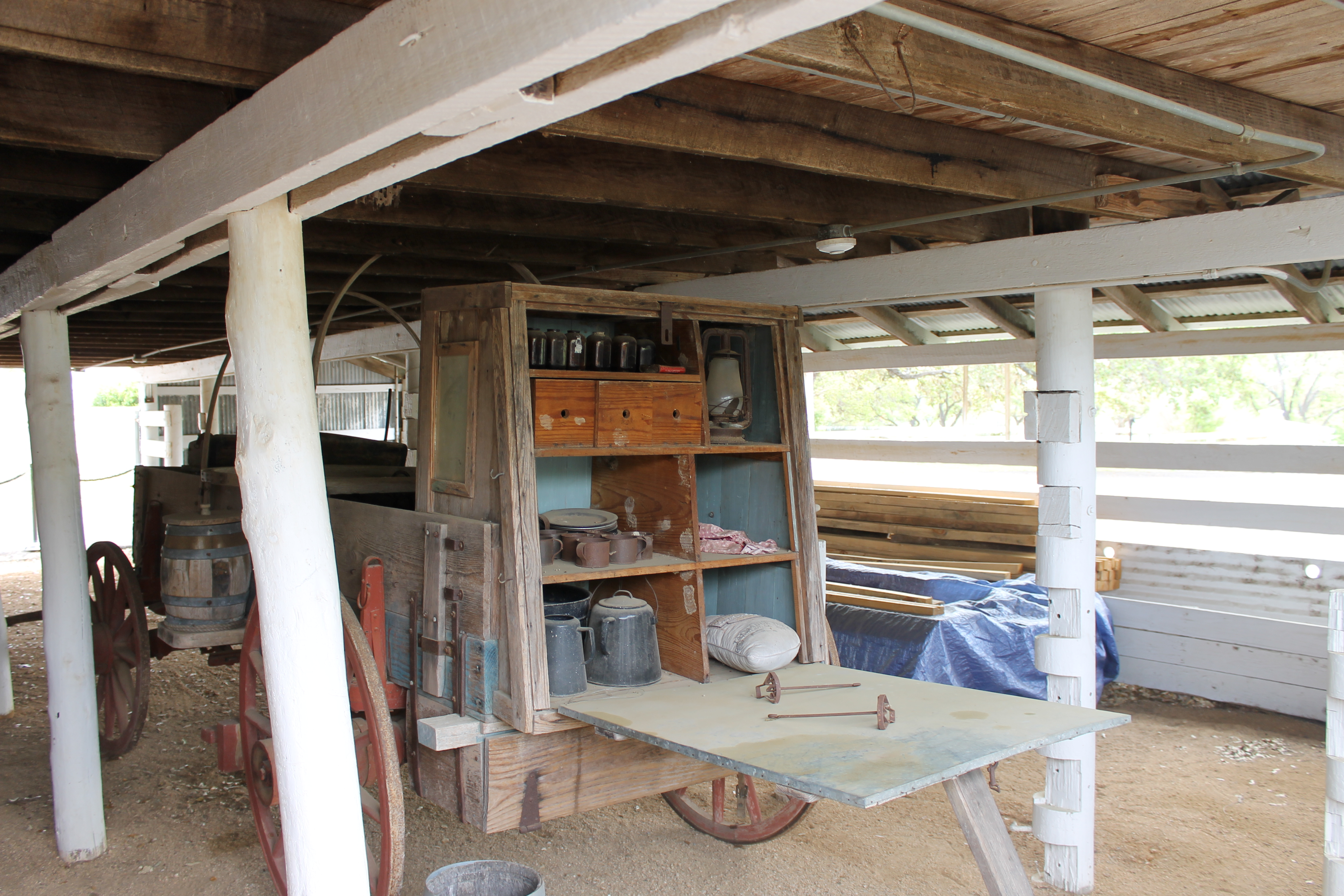
Chuckwagon at LBJ Ranch used for preparing barbecues.

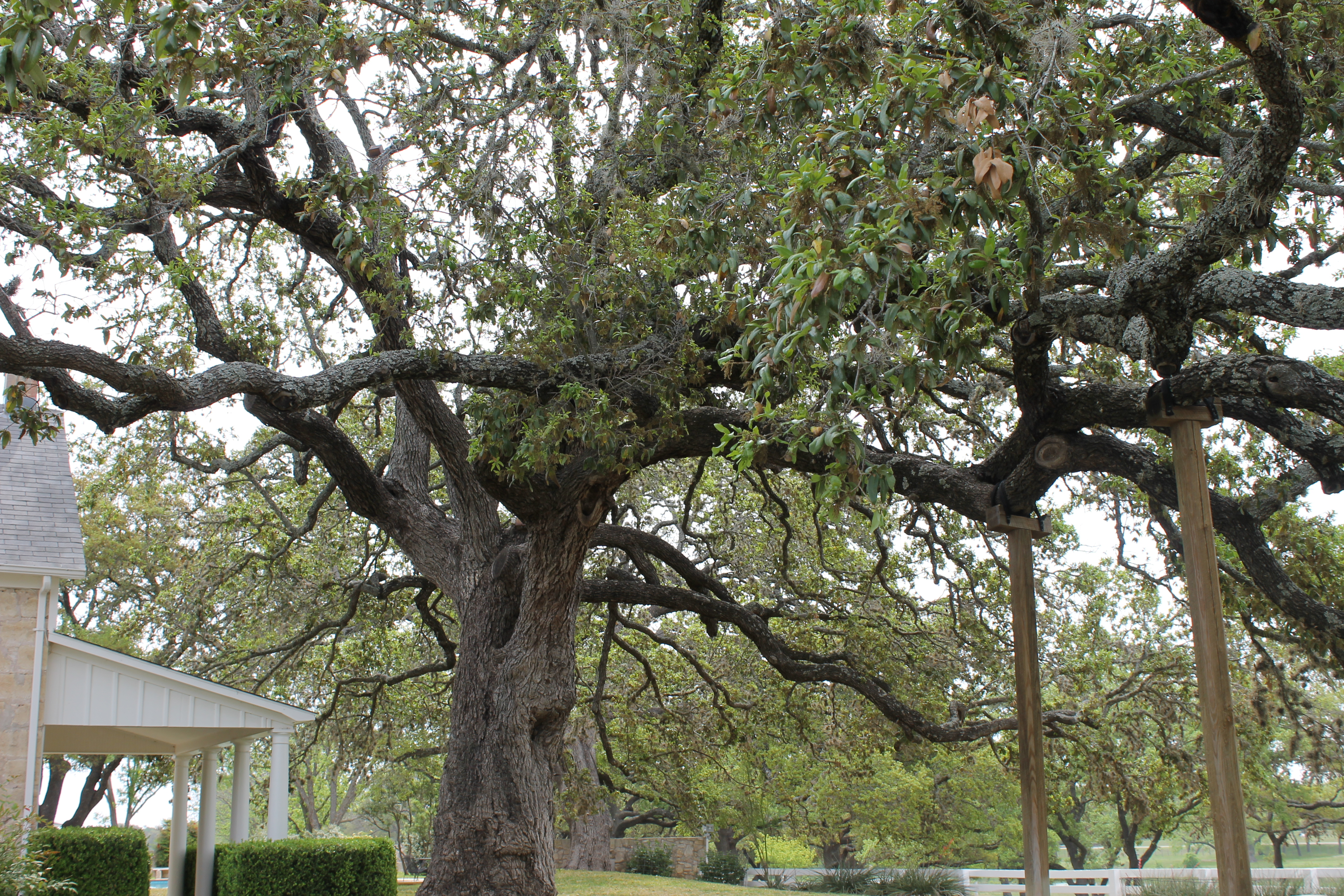
Large live oak tree in front of entrance to LBJ Ranch

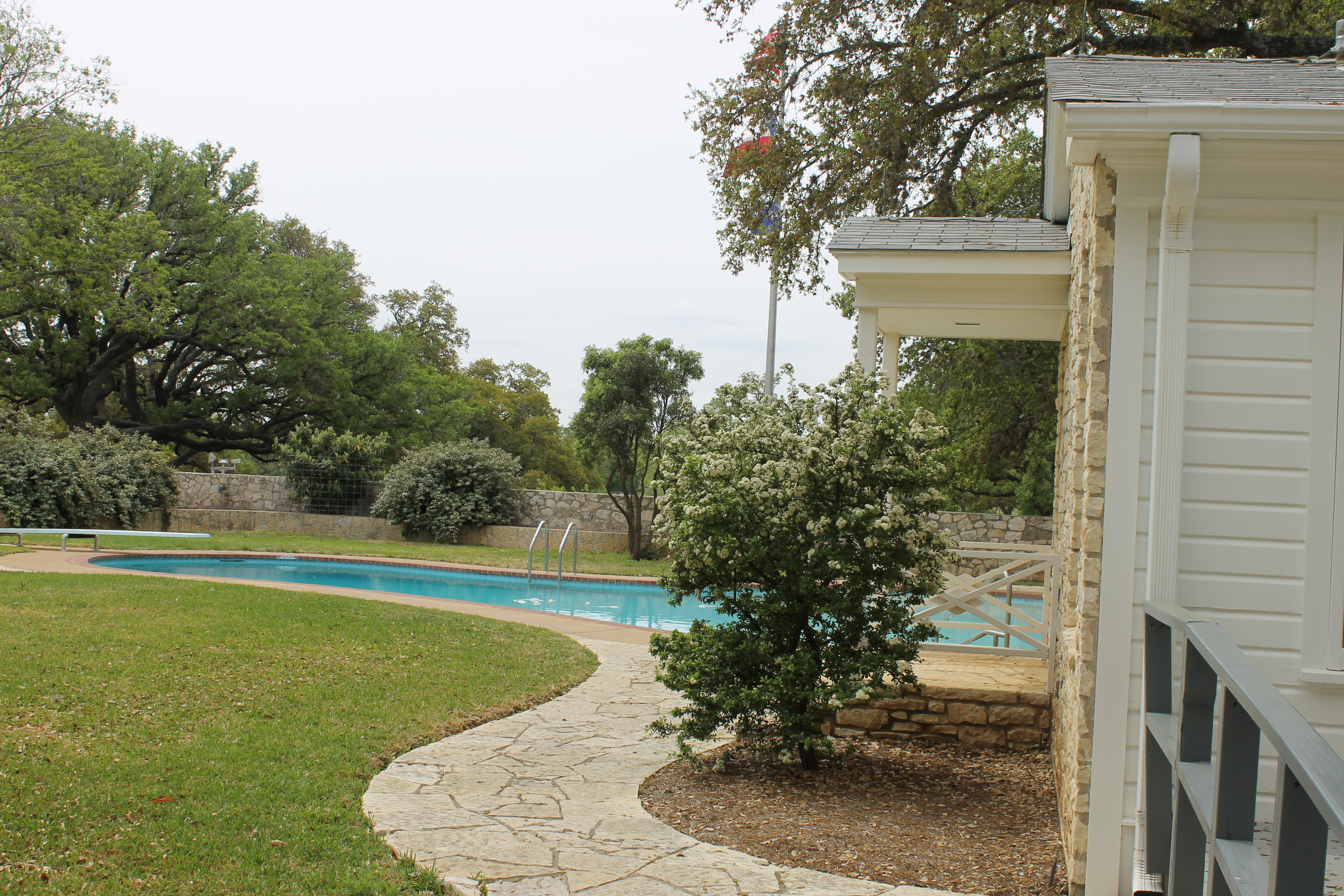
The pool at the LBJ Ranch was installed in 1955 after then Senator Johnson's heart attack. He was supposed to use it for exercise, but Mrs. Johnson spent far more time in the water.

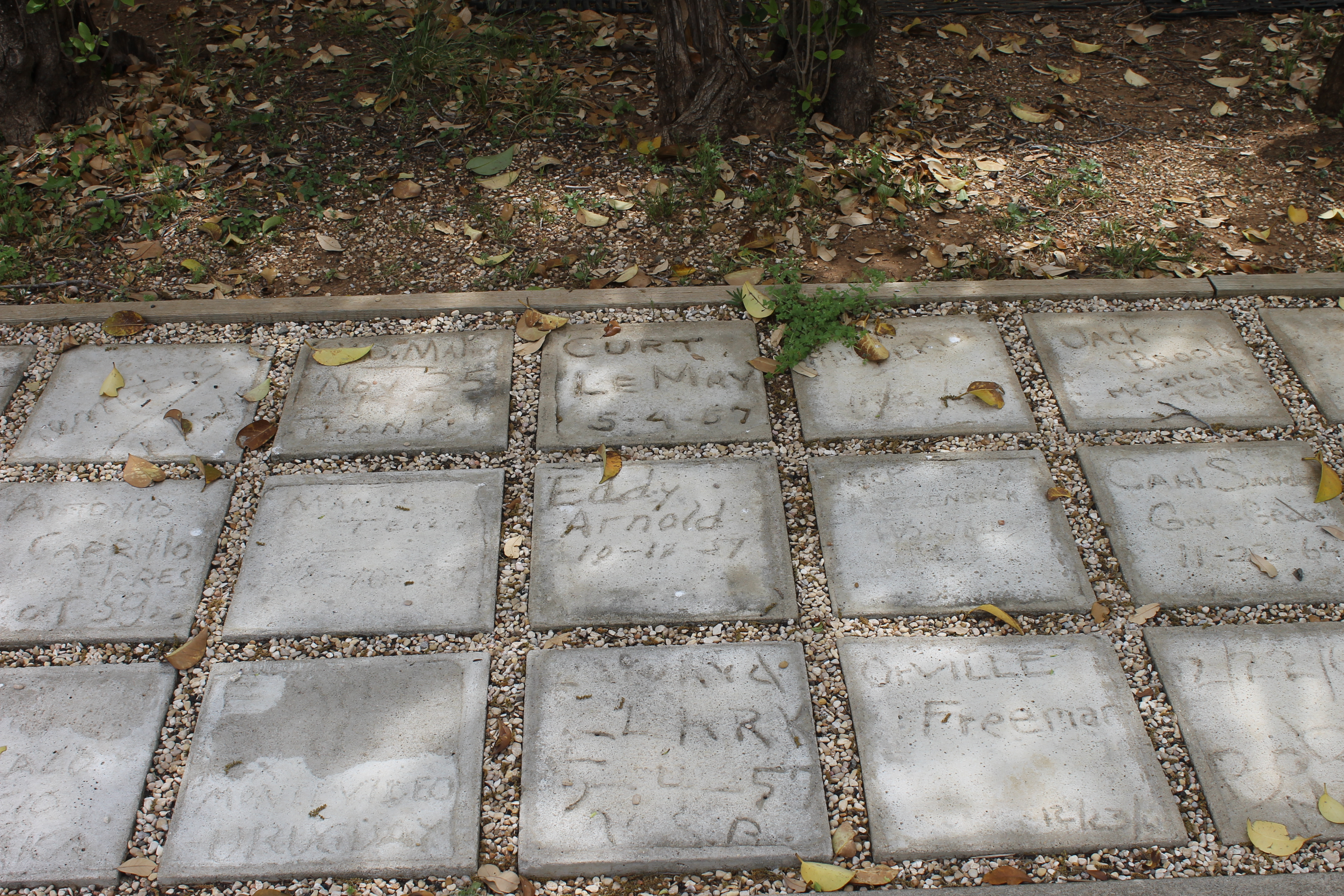
Guests at the LBJ Ranch were sometimes invited to place their names in cement for posterity; here one can see the names of Orville Freeman, Curtis LeMay, and singer Eddy Arnold.

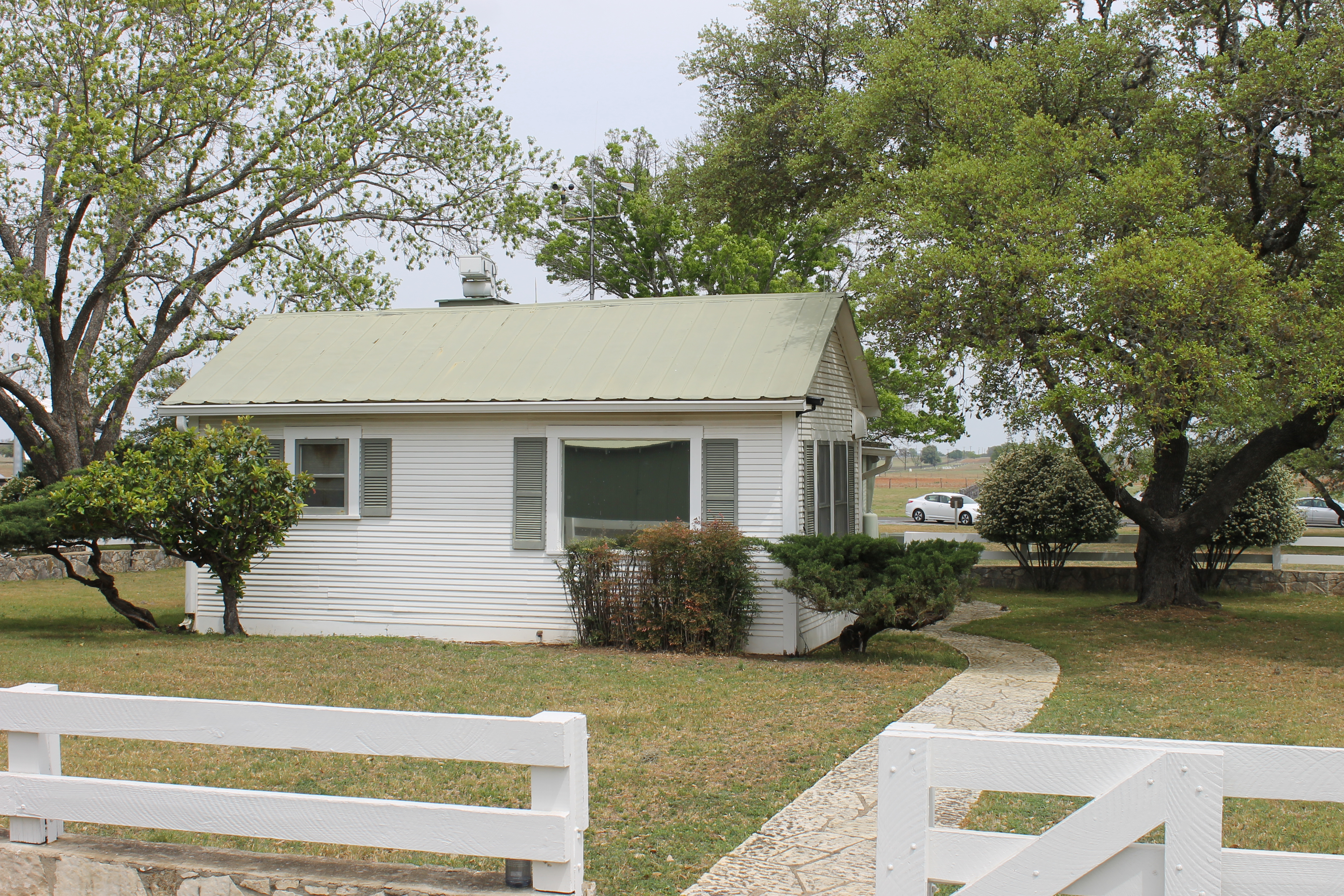
United States Secret Service agents guarding President Johnson lived in this small house while on duty at the LBJ Ranch.

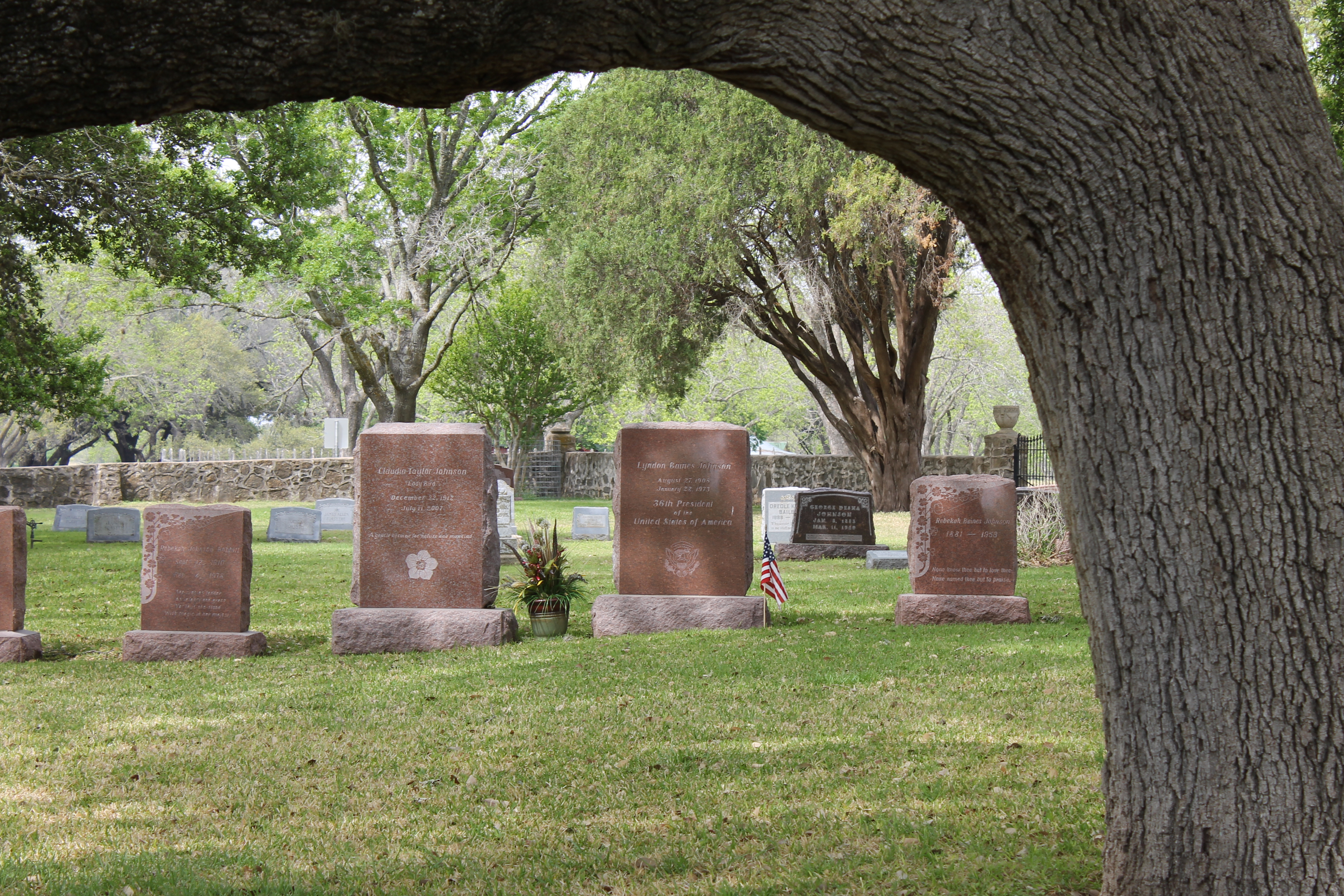
The graves of Lady Bird and Lyndon Johnson (his with flag) at family cemetery in the national historical park; the public is not allowed entry into the cemetery.

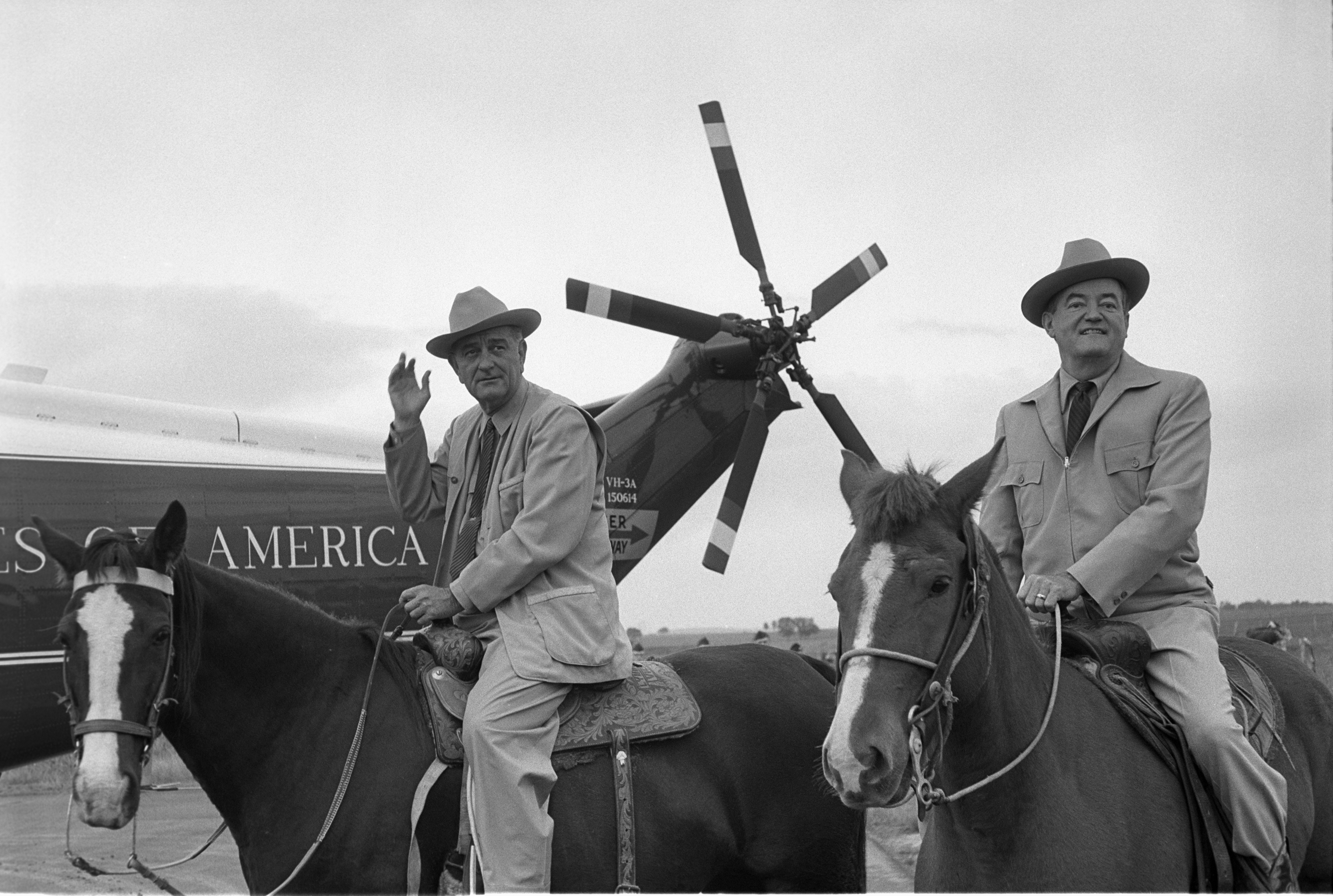
President Johnson and Vice-president-elect Humphrey in LBJ ranch shortly after winning 1964 election

== See also ==
- List of National Historic Landmarks in Texas
- List of residences of presidents of the United States
- List of burial places of presidents and vice presidents of the United States
- National Register of Historic Places listings in Blanco County, Texas
- National Register of Historic Places listings in Gillespie County, Texas
- Presidential memorials in the United States
- Recorded Texas Historic Landmarks in Blanco County
- Recorded Texas Historic Landmarks in Gillespie County
