= Segovia, Texas =

Town in Kimble County, Texas, US

Coordinates: 30°25′10″N 99°40′13″W

Segovia is a town in Kimble County, Texas, United States. The community is located off Interstate 10. Only a few roads go through the town, one being FM 2169. The town was named for Segovia in Spain. It consists of a hotel and general store and has a population of less than 25. It has not had a post office since 1964.
