= Stonewall, Texas =

- Census-designated place
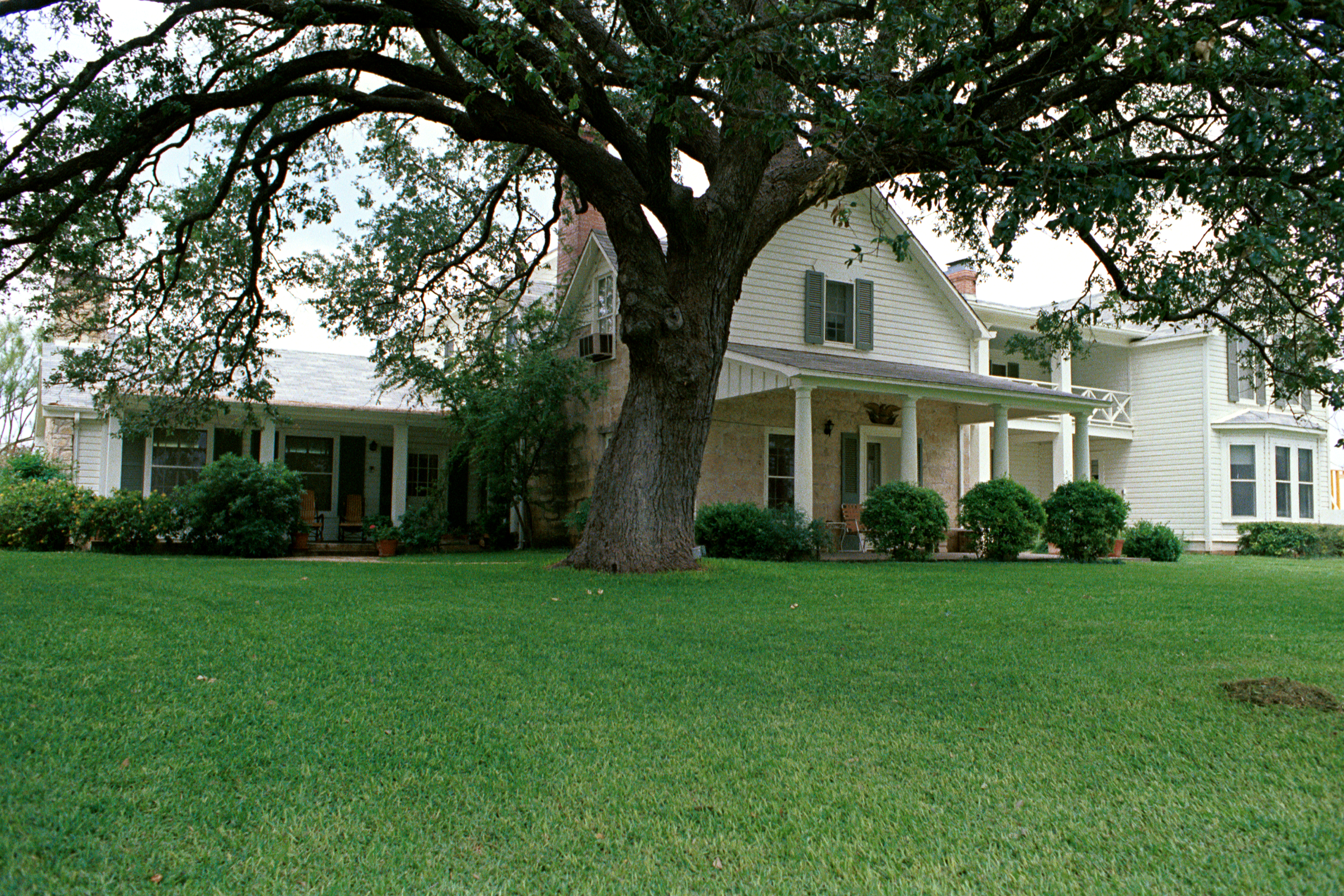
- LBJ Ranch in Stonewall, Texas

- Location within the state of Texas Stonewall (the United States)
- Coordinates: 30°15′25″N 98°39′25″W
- Country: United States
- State: Texas
- County: Gillespie

Area
  - Total: 15.2 sq mi (39.4 km^{2})
  - Land: 15.1 sq mi (39.0 km^{2})
  - Water: 0.15 sq mi (0.4 km^{2})
- Elevation: 1,506 ft (459 m)

Population (2020)
  - Total: 451
  - Density: 30.0/sq mi (11.6/km^{2})
- Time zone: UTC-6 (Central (CST))
  - Summer (DST): UTC-5 (CDT)
- ZIP code: 78671
- Area code: 830
- FIPS code: 48-70460
- GNIS feature ID: 2410003

Stonewall is an unincorporated community and census-designated place (CDP) in Gillespie County, Texas, United States. Its population was 451 at the 2020 census. It was named for Confederate General Thomas J. "Stonewall" Jackson.

== History ==
It was named for Confederate General Thomas J. "Stonewall" Jackson, by Israel P. Nunez, who established a stage station near the site in 1870.

Stonewall was the home of former U.S. President Lyndon B. Johnson, and the LBJ Ranch is located nearby.

== Geography ==
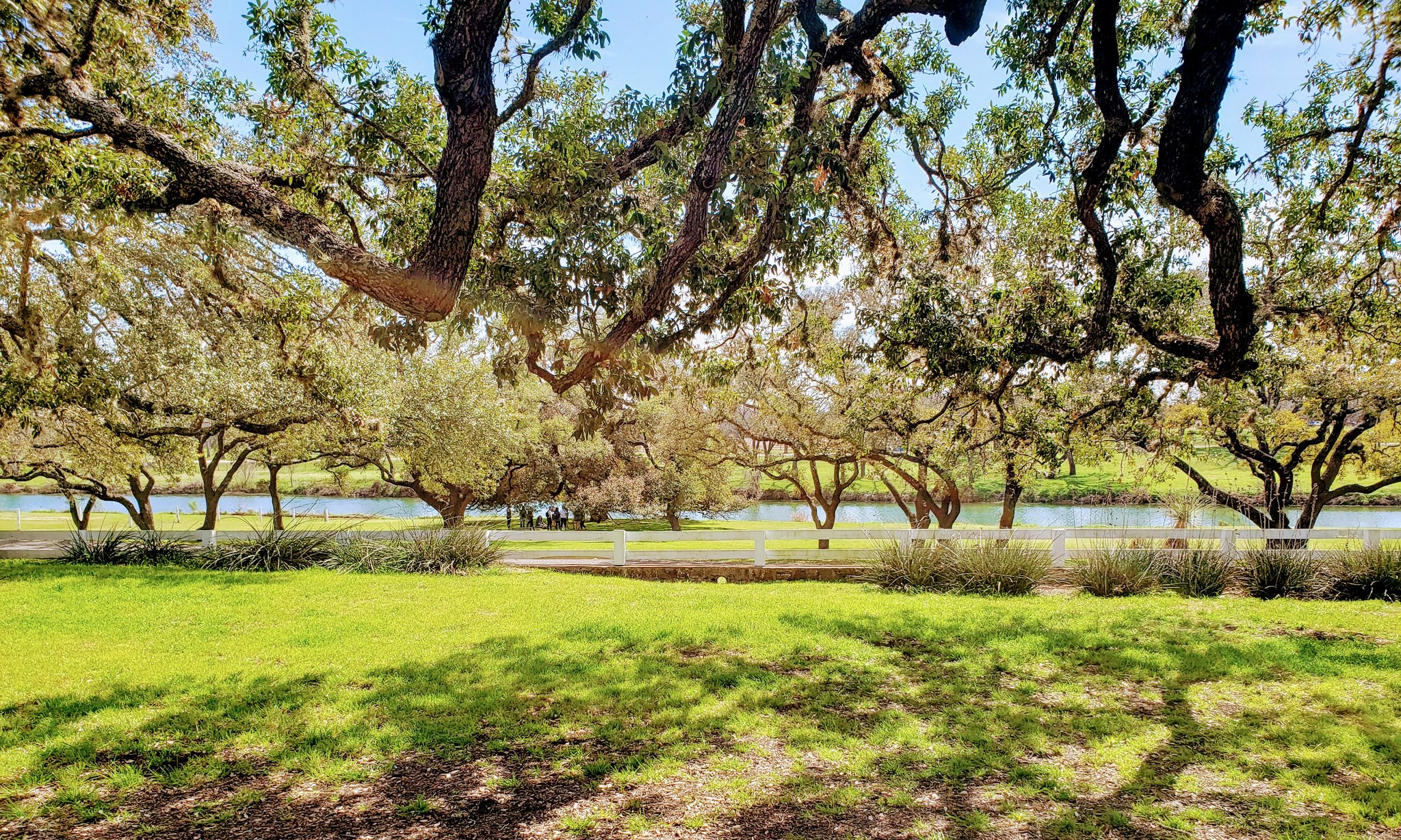
Pedernales River as it passes through the LBJ Ranch near Stonewall.

Stonewall is located in eastern Gillespie County on the Pedernales River, in the Hill Country of central Texas. U.S. Route 290 passes through the community, leading west 14 miles (23 km) to Fredericksburg, the Gillespie County seat, and east 15 miles (24 km) to Johnson City. Stonewall is 63 miles (101 km) west of Austin and 71 miles (114 km) north of San Antonio.

According to the U.S. Census Bureau, the Stonewall CDP has a total area of 15.2 square miles (39.4 km^{2}), of which 15.1 square miles (39.0 km^{2}) are land and 0.2 square miles (0.4 km^{2}), or 0.95%, is covered by water. The Pedernales River flows from west to east just north of the center of town.

=== Climate ===
The climate in this area is characterized by hot, humid summers and generally mild to cool winters. According to the Köppen climate classification, Stonewall has a humid subtropical climate, Cfa on climate maps.

Climate data for Stonewall, Texas
Month	Jan	Feb	Mar	Apr	May	Jun	Jul	Aug	Sep	Oct	Nov	Dec	Year
Mean daily maximum °F (°C)	61.0 (16.1)	64.0 (17.8)	72.0 (22.2)	79.0 (26.1)	84.0 (28.9)	92.0 (33.3)	94.0 (34.4)	95.0 (35.0)	88.0 (31.1)	80.0 (26.7)	69.0 (20.6)	62.0 (16.7)	78.3 (25.7)
Mean daily minimum °F (°C)	38.0 (3.3)	41.0 (5.0)	49.0 (9.4)	56.0 (13.3)	64.0 (17.8)	70.0 (21.1)	72.0 (22.2)	72.0 (22.2)	66.0 (18.9)	57.0 (13.9)	47.0 (8.3)	39.0 (3.9)	55.9 (13.3)
Average precipitation inches (mm)	2.1 (53)	1.0 (25)	2.0 (51)	2.1 (53)	5.1 (130)	1.5 (38)	1.4 (36)	1.5 (38)	4.8 (120)	2.8 (71)	2.0 (51)	1.6 (41)	27.9 (707)
Average precipitation days	3	2	4	4	5	3	2	2	5	3	3	3	39
Source: NOAA

== Demographics ==
Historical population
Census	Pop.	Note	%±
2000	469		—
2010	505		7.7%
2020	451		−10.7%
U.S. Decennial Census; 1850–1900 1910; 1920 1930 1940; 1950 1960 1970; 1980 1990 2000; 2010 2020

Stonewall first appeared as a CDP in the 2000 U.S. census.

=== 2020 census ===
Stonewall CDP, Texas – Racial and ethnic composition Note: The US Census treats Hispanic/Latino as an ethnic category. This table excludes Latinos from the racial categories and assigns them to a separate category. Hispanics/Latinos may be of any race.
Race / Ethnicity (NH = Non-Hispanic)	Pop 2000	Pop 2010	Pop 2020	% 2000	% 2010	% 2020
White alone (NH)	300	320	285	63.97%	63.37%	63.19%
Black or African American alone (NH)	0	3	5	0.00%	0.59%	1.11%
Native American or Alaska Native alone (NH)	0	0	2	0.00%	0.00%	0.44%
Asian alone (NH)	0	0	1	0.00%	0.00%	0.22%
Native Hawaiian or Pacific Islander alone (NH)	0	0	0	0.00%	0.00%	0.00%
Other race alone (NH)	0	0	2	0.00%	0.00%	0.44%
Multiracial (NH)	4	0	3	0.85%	0.00%	0.67%
Hispanic or Latino (any race)	165	182	153	35.18%	36.04%	33.92%
Total	469	505	451	100.00%	100.00%	100.00%

=== 2000 census ===
As of the census of 2000, 469 people, 176 households, and 133 families resided in the CDP. The population density was 30.9 inhabitants per square mile (11.9/km^{2}). The 203 housing units had an average density of 13.4/sq mi (5.2/km^{2}). The racial makeup of the CDP was 81.24% White, 17.91% from other races, and 0.85% from two or more races. Hispanics or Latinos of any race were 35.18% of the population.

Of the 176 households, 34.1% had children under 18 living with them, 58.0% were married couples living together, 13.6% had a female householder with no husband present, and 24.4% were not families. About 20.5% of all households were made up of individuals, and 10.8% had someone living alone who was 65 or older. The average household size was 2.66, and the average family size was 3.07.

In the CDP, the age distribution was 28.1% under 18, 7.7% from 18 to 24, 22.6% from 25 to 44, 22.4% from 45 to 64, and 19.2% who were 65 or older. The median age was 37 years. For every 100 females, there were 103.0 males. For every 100 females 18 and over, there were 92.6 males.

The median income in the CDP was $36,210 for a household and $37,721 for a family. Males had a median income of $29,531 versus $30,083 for females. The per capita income for the CDP was $22,035. About 19.3% of families and 17.1% of the population were below the poverty line, including 30.2% of those under 18 and 32.0% of those 65 or over.

== Education ==
Stonewall is served by the Fredericksburg Independent School District.
