= List of Farm to Market Roads in Texas =

- Texas Farm to Market Road and Ranch to Market Road markers

Highway names
- Interstates: Interstate X (I-X); Interstate Highway X (IH-X)
- US Highways: U.S. Highway X (US X)
- State: State Highway X (SH X)
- Loops: Loop X
- Spurs: Spur X
- Recreational: Recreational Road X (R X)
- Farm or Ranch to Market Roads: Farm to Market Road X (FM X); Ranch to Market Road X (RM X)
- Park Roads: Park Road X (PR X)

System links
- Highways in Texas; Interstate; US; State; Former; Toll; Loops; Spurs; FM/RM; Park; Rec

Farm to Market Roads in Texas are owned and maintained by the Texas Department of Transportation (TxDOT).

== List ==
=== Farm/Ranch to Market Road ===
- List of Farm to Market Roads in Texas (1–99)
- List of Farm to Market Roads in Texas (100–199)
- List of Farm to Market Roads in Texas (200–299)
- List of Farm to Market Roads in Texas (300–399)
- List of Farm to Market Roads in Texas (400–499)
- List of Farm to Market Roads in Texas (500–599)
- List of Farm to Market Roads in Texas (600–699)
- List of Farm to Market Roads in Texas (700–799)
- List of Farm to Market Roads in Texas (800–899)
- List of Farm to Market Roads in Texas (900–999)
- List of Farm to Market Roads in Texas (1000–1099)
- List of Farm to Market Roads in Texas (1100–1199)
- List of Farm to Market Roads in Texas (1200–1299)
- List of Farm to Market Roads in Texas (1300–1399)
- List of Farm to Market Roads in Texas (1400–1499)
- List of Farm to Market Roads in Texas (1500–1599)
- List of Farm to Market Roads in Texas (1600–1699)
- List of Farm to Market Roads in Texas (1700–1799)
- List of Farm to Market Roads in Texas (1800–1899)
- List of Farm to Market Roads in Texas (1900–1999)
- List of Farm to Market Roads in Texas (2000–2099)
- List of Farm to Market Roads in Texas (2100–2199)
- List of Farm to Market Roads in Texas (2200–2299)
- List of Farm to Market Roads in Texas (2300–2399)
- List of Farm to Market Roads in Texas (2400–2499)
- List of Farm to Market Roads in Texas (2500–2599)
- List of Farm to Market Roads in Texas (2600–2699)
- List of Farm to Market Roads in Texas (2700–2799)
- List of Farm to Market Roads in Texas (2800–2899)
- List of Farm to Market Roads in Texas (2900–2999)
- List of Farm to Market Roads in Texas (3000–3099)
- List of Farm to Market Roads in Texas (3100–3199)
- List of Farm to Market Roads in Texas (3200–3299)
- List of Farm to Market Roads in Texas (3300–3399)
- List of Farm to Market Roads in Texas (3400–3499)
- List of Farm to Market Roads in Texas (3500–9999)

=== Ranch Road ===
Separate-but-equal designation; not officially a Farm to Market or Ranch to Market Road

- Ranch Road 1
