= Ranch to Market Road 473 =

State road in Kendall and Blanco counties in Texas, United States

Ranch to Market Road 473

Route information
- Maintained by TxDOT
- Length: 39.733 mi (63.944 km)
- Existed: 1945–present

Major junctions
- West end: SH 27 in Comfort
- US 87 in Comfort; US 281
- East end: RM 32

Location
- Country: United States
- State: Texas
- Counties: Kendall, Blanco

Highway system
- Highways in Texas; Interstate; US; State; Former; Toll; Loops; Spurs; FM/RM; Park; Rec
← FM 472	→ RM 474

Ranch to Market Road 473 (RM 473) is a ranch to market road in Kendall and Blanco counties in the U.S. state of Texas.

== Route description ==
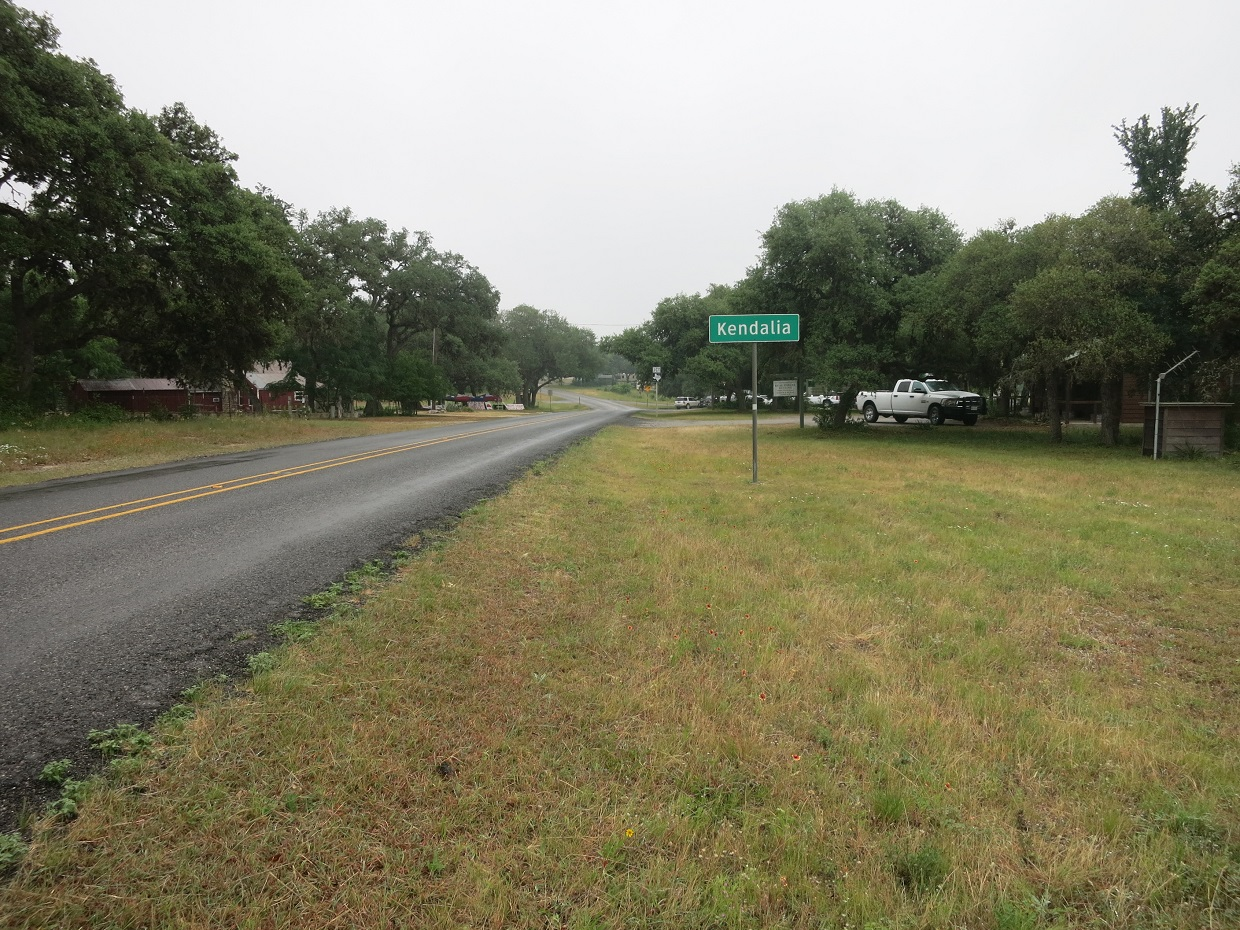
Eastbound RM 473 entering Kendalia, May 2017

RM 473 begins in Comfort, at an intersection with SH 27. The route travels through the business district of Comfort, intersecting Business US 87. RM 473 then passes under I-10/US 87, but there is no direct junction with the freeway. Outside of Comfort, RM 473 continues eastward to Sisterdale, where it has a brief concurrency with RM 1376. It continues eastward through Kendalia and intersects US 281 south of Twin Sisters. The two routes stay merged for about two miles; US 281 continues north while RM 473 resumes a generally eastbound direction. RM 473 ends at an intersection with RM 32.

== History ==
The route was originally designated as Farm to Market Road 473 (FM 473) on July 9, 1945, as a short route connecting US 87 in Comfort to Nichols Ranch 4.7 miles (7.6 km) to the east. This route was extended several times: to 4.7 miles (7.6 km) east of Nichols Ranch on February 25, 1949; to Sisterdale on July 14 of that year, to RM 474 on December 18, 1951; and to US 281 on January 29, 1953, replacing FM 1622. The designation was changed to RM 473 on October 1, 1956. The addition of the section between US 281 and RM 32 occurred on November 26, 1969. While the official designation has not been amended, signage indicates that the route begins at SH 27, and not at US 87 (or its successor business route).

== Major intersections ==
The total mileage in the table below is greater than that given by TxDOT, because the concurrency with US 281 is not included in its official description or mileage; however, the route is signed as concurrent.

County	Location	mi	km	Destinations	Notes
Kendall	Comfort	0.0	0.0	SH 27 – Center Point	Western terminus
Kendall	Comfort	0.4	0.64	Bus. US 87 – Boerne, Fredericksburg	
Kendall	Sisterdale	12.4	20.0	RM 1376 north – Luckenbach	Western end of RM 1376 concurrency
Kendall	Sisterdale	13.2	21.2	RM 1376 south – Boerne	Eastern end of RM 1376 concurrency
Kendall		19.2	30.9	RM 474 – Boerne	
Kendall	Kendalia	26.4	42.5	FM 3351 – Bergheim	
Blanco		33.9	54.6	US 281 south – San Antonio	Western end of US 281 concurrency
Blanco	Twin Sisters	35.8	57.6	US 281 north – Blanco	Eastern end of US 281 concurrency
Blanco		41.5	66.8	RM 32 – Fischer	Eastern terminus
1.000 mi = 1.609 km; 1.000 km = 0.621 mi: Concurrency terminus

== See also ==
- List of Ranch to Market Roads in Texas
