= List of Farm to Market Roads in Texas (3300–3399) =

- Texas Farm to Market Road and Ranch to Market Road markers

Highway names
- Interstates: Interstate Highway X (IH-X, I-X)
- US Highways: U.S. Highway X (US X)
- State: State Highway X (SH X)
- Loops: Loop X
- Spurs: Spur X
- Recreational: Recreational Road X (RE X)
- Farm or Ranch to Market Roads: Farm to Market Road X (FM X); Ranch to Market Road X (RM X)
- Park Roads: Park Road X (PR X)

System links
- Highways in Texas; Interstate; US; State; Former; Toll; Loops; Spurs; FM/RM; Park; Rec

Farm to Market Roads in Texas are owned and maintained by the Texas Department of Transportation (TxDOT).

== FM 3300 ==
Farm to Market Road 3300
- Location: Swisher and Briscoe counties
- Length: 5.93 mi (9.54 km)
- Existed: April 25, 1978–present

Farm to Market Road 3300 (FM 3300) is located in Swisher and Briscoe counties. It begins at FM 2301 south of FM 146 and continues east to SH 207.

FM 3300 was designated on April 25, 1978, along its current route.

=== FM 3300 (1973) ===
Farm to Market Road 3300
- Location: Archer County
- Existed: September 5, 1973–December 31, 1975

A previous route numbered FM 3300 was designated on September 5, 1973, from FM 2846, 5.5 miles (8.9 km) north of Dundee, west 1.4 miles (2.3 km) to a county road. FM 3300 was cancelled on December 31, 1975, and became a portion of FM 1180.

== FM 3301 ==
Farm to Market Road 3301
- Location: Montague County
- Length: 2.395 mi (3.854 km)
- Existed: 1973–present

Farm to Market Road 3301 (FM 3301) is located in Montague County. It runs from FM 1956 east of Nocona north approximately 2.4 miles (3.9 km). The roadway beyond the northern terminus is Uselton Road.

FM 3301 was designated on September 5, 1973, along its current route.

== FM 3302 ==
Farm to Market Road 3302
- Location: Hamilton County
- Length: 1.396 mi (2.247 km)
- Existed: March 27, 1997–present

Farm to Market Road 3302 (FM 3302) is located in Hamilton County. It runs 1.4 miles (2.3 km) from FM 2005 to US 281 south of Hamilton, near Hamilton Municipal Airport.

FM 3302 was designated on March 27, 1997, along the current route. In exchange for its creation, FM Spur 221 and FM Spur 1241 were given to the county.

=== FM 3302 (1973) ===
Farm to Market Road 3302
- Location: Gray County
- Existed: May 5, 1973–December 15, 1983

A previous route numbered FM 3302 was designated in Gray County on May 5, 1973, from SH 152, 4.8 miles (7.7 km) east of US 60, to a point 4.0 miles (6.4 km) south. FM 3302 was cancelled on December 15, 1983, transferred to RM 1474.

== FM 3303 ==
Farm to Market Road 3303
- Location: Hemphill and Wheeler counties
- Length: 6.209 mi (9.992 km)
- Existed: 1973–present

Farm to Market Road 3303 (FM 3303) is located in Hemphill County. It runs from FM 277 east of US 83 to FM 1046 east of Briscoe.

== FM 3304 ==
Farm to Market Road 3304
- Location: Cochran County
- Length: 4.76 mi (7.66 km)
- Existed: 1973–present

Farm to Market Road 3304 (FM 3304) is located in Cochran County. It begins at SH 114 northwest of Morton and continues south to FM 1169.

== FM 3305 ==
Farm to Market Road 3305
- Location: Cochran County
- Length: 4.221 mi (6.793 km)
- Existed: 1973–present

Farm to Market Road 3305 (FM 3305) is located in Cochran County. It begins at SH 214 north of Morton and continues east 4.221 miles (6.793 km).

== FM 3306 ==
Farm to Market Road 3306
- Location: Gaines County
- Length: 8.006 mi (12.884 km)
- Existed: 1973–present

Farm to Market Road 3306 (FM 3306) is located in Gaines County. It begins south of FM 1757 and continues south to US 62 and 180, east of the Texas/New Mexico State Line.

== RM 3307 ==
Ranch to Market Road 3307
- Location: Sutton County
- Length: 0.731 mi (1,176 m)
- Existed: 1973–present

Farm to Market Road 3307 (FM 3307) is located in Sutton County. It runs from Interstate 10 at Allison Rd southwest to RM 3130.

== FM 3308 ==
Farm to Market Road 3308
- Location: Taylor County
- Length: 2.139 mi (3.442 km)
- Existed: 1973–present

Farm to Market Road 3308 (FM 3308) is located in Taylor County in northern Abilene.

FM 3308 begins at an intersection with FM 600 near County Road 501. The highway travels in a northeastern direction along Neas Road, ending at an intersection with FM 2833.

FM 3308 was designated on September 5, 1973, along the current route. On June 27, 1995, the entire route was redesignated Urban Road 3308 (UR 3308). The designation reverted to FM 3308 with the elimination of the Urban Road system on November 15, 2018.

== FM 3309 ==
Farm to Market Road 3309
- Location: Anderson County
- Length: 2.265 mi (3.645 km)
- Existed: 1973–present

Farm to Market Road 3309 (FM 3309) is located in Anderson County. It begins at FM 315 north of SH 155 and continues west and south to SH 155 in Palestine.

== FM 3310 ==
Farm to Market Road 3310
- Location: Rusk County
- Length: 3.32 mi (5.34 km)
- Existed: 1973–present

Farm to Market Road 3310 (FM 3310) is located in Rusk County. It begins at US 79 and South Main St in Henderson and continues southeast to US 259.

== FM 3311 ==
Farm to Market Road 3311
- Location: Smith County
- Length: 2.068 mi (3.328 km)
- Existed: 1973–present

Farm to Market Road 3311 (FM 3311) is located in Smith County. It begins at FM 3270 in Owentown and continues northeast to SH 155.

== FM 3312 ==
Farm to Market Road 3312
- Location: Angelina County
- Existed: September 5, 1973–April 25, 2002

Farm to Market Road 3312 (FM 3312) was located in Angelina County.

FM 3312 was designated on September 5, 1973, running from FM 2108 southward at a distance of 1.8 miles (2.9 km). The highway was cancelled and redesignated as an extension of FM 819 on April 25, 2002.

== FM 3313 ==
Farm to Market Road 3313
- Location: Houston County
- Length: 0.833 mi (1,341 m)
- Existed: 1973–present

Farm to Market Road 3313 (FM 3313) is located in Houston County. It begins at FM 2022 northeast of Crockett and continues northwest.

== FM 3314 ==
Farm to Market Road 3314
- Location: Nacogdoches County
- Length: 0.868 mi (1,397 m)
- Existed: September 5, 1973–present

Farm to Market Road 3314 (FM 3314) is located in Nacogdoches County. It begins at a junction with FM 1638 (Old Tyler Road) and US 59 / Loop 224 (Northwest Stallings Drive) on the northwestern edge of Nacogdoches. FM 3314 heads very briefly south along the two-lane Northwest Stallings Drive before turning west along Lone Star Road. (The roadway continues south to become the one-way southbound on ramp of the Old Tyler Road / Lone Star Road interchange.) FM 3314 then continues west for about 0.8 miles (1.3 km) before state maintenance ends.

FM 3314 was designated on September 5, 1973, along the current route.

== FM 3315 ==
Farm to Market Road 3315
- Location: Sabine County
- Length: 5.009 mi (8.061 km)
- Existed: 1973–present

Farm to Market Road 3315 (FM 3315) is located in Sabine County. It begins at SH 87 north of the Newton County line and continues east approximately 5 miles (8.0 km).

== FM 3316 ==
Farm to Market Road 3316
- Location: San Augustine County
- Length: 0.67 mi (1,080 m)
- Existed: 1973–present

Farm to Market Road 3316 (FM 3316) is located in San Augustine County. It begins at FM 1196 north of FM 1277 and continues north to Attoyac Church.

== FM 3317 ==
Farm to Market Road 3317
- Location: Trinity County
- Length: 1.192 mi (1.918 km)
- Existed: 1973–present

Farm to Market Road 3317 (FM 3317) is located in Trinity County. It begins at SH 94 northeast of Groveton and continues east 1.192 miles (1.918 km).

== FM 3318 ==
Farm to Market Road 3318
- Location: Waller County
- Length: 2.282 mi (3.673 km)
- Existed: 1973–present

Farm to Market Road 3318 (FM 3318) is located in Waller County. It begins at FM 1458 near the Brazos River and continues north 2.282 miles (3.673 km).

== FM 3319 ==
Farm to Market Road 3319
- Location: Oldham County
- Length: 5.869 mi (9.445 km)
- Existed: November 25, 1975–present

Farm to Market Road 3319 (FM 3319) is located in Oldham County. It begins at Interstate 40 northwest of Vega and continues south and west to the Deaf Smith County Line.

=== FM 3319 (1973) ===
Farm to Market Road 3319
- Location: Wharton County
- Existed: September 5, 1973–August 29, 1974

A previous route numbered FM 3319 was designated on September 5, 1973, from US 90 Alt. at Lissie, 2 miles (3.2 km) east of FM 2764, to a point 3.9 miles (6.3 km) southwest. FM 3319 was cancelled on August 29, 1974, and removed from the highway system in exchange for extending FM 1162.

== FM 3320 ==
Farm to Market Road 3320
- Location: Kleberg County
- Length: 2.008 mi (3.232 km)
- Existed: 1973–present

Farm to Market Road 3320 (FM 3320) is located in Kleberg County. It begins at FM 425 in Kingsville and continues south to FM 1717.

== FM 3321 ==
Farm to Market Road 3321
- Location: Fannin County
- Length: 3.371 mi (5.425 km)
- Existed: November 25, 1975–present

Farm to Market Road 3321 (FM 3321) is located in Fannin County. It begins at FM 274 via Mulberry and continues west, north, and east 3.371 miles (5.425 km).

=== FM 3321 (1973) ===
Farm to Market Road 3321
- Location: Nueces County
- Existed: September 5, 1973–November 25, 1975

A previous route numbered FM 3321 was designated on September 5, 1973, from SH 44 south 5.0 miles (8.0 km) to FM 2826, 3 miles (4.8 km) west of US 77. FM 3321 was cancelled on November 25, 1975, and removed from the highway system; the funds released were used towards future Farm to Market road projects in the county.

== FM 3322 ==
Farm to Market Road 3322
- Location: Jefferson County
- Length: 1.448 mi (2.330 km)
- Existed: September 5, 1973–present

Farm to Market Road 3322 (FM 3322) is located in Jefferson County. The highway runs from SH 87 in Sabine Pass southeastward to Sabine Pass Battleground State Historic Site.

== FM 3323 ==
Farm to Market Road 3323
- Location: Hall County
- Existed: September 5, 1973–present

== FM 3324 ==
Farm to Market Road 3324
- Location: Jack County
- Existed: May 7, 1974–present

== FM 3325 ==
Farm to Market Road 3325
- Location: Parker County
- Existed: May 7, 1974–present

== FM 3326 ==
Farm to Market Road 3326
- Location: Jones County
- Length: 8.894 mi (14.314 km)
- Existed: May 25, 1976–present

=== FM 3326 (1974) ===
Farm to Market Road 3326
- Location: Baylor County
- Existed: May 7, 1974–May 4, 1976

A previous route numbered FM 3326 was designated on May 7, 1974, from FM 1152, 3.5 miles (5.6 km) south and east of Bomarton, to a point 3.5 miles (5.6 km) south. FM 3326 was cancelled on May 4, 1976, and removed from the highway system when the county refused construction.

== FM 3327 ==
Farm to Market Road 3327
- Location: Throckmorton County
- Length: 2.314 mi (3.724 km)
- Existed: May 7, 1974–present

== FM 3328 ==
Farm to Market Road 3328
- Location: Anderson County
- Length: 1.434 mi (2.308 km)
- Existed: November 17, 1977–present

=== FM 3328 (1974) ===
Farm to Market Road 3328
- Location: Wilbarger County
- Existed: May 7, 1974–December 31, 1975

A previous route numbered FM 3328 was designated on May 7, 1974, from FM 1811, 4.5 miles (7.2 km) west of the Wichita County line, to a point 2.0 miles (3.2 km) south. FM 3328 was cancelled on December 31, 1975, and became a portion of FM 2326.

== FM 3329 ==
Farm to Market Road 3329
- Location: Young County
- Length: 5.549 mi (8.930 km)
- Existed: May 7, 1974–present

== FM 3330 ==
Farm to Market Road 3330
- Location: Armstrong County
- Length: 2.236 mi (3.598 km)
- Existed: May 7, 1974–present

== FM 3331 ==
Farm to Market Road 3331
- Location: Randall County
- Length: 4.157 mi (6.690 km)
- Existed: May 7, 1974–present

== FM 3332 ==
Farm to Market Road 3332
- Location: Lynn County
- Length: 8.119 mi (13.066 km)
- Existed: May 7, 1974–present

== FM 3333 ==
Farm to Market Road 3333
- Location: Parmer County
- Length: 9.268 mi (14.915 km)
- Existed: May 7, 1974–present

== FM 3334 ==
Farm to Market Road 3334
- Location: Reeves County
- Length: 7.652 mi (12.315 km)
- Existed: 1974–present

Farm to Market Road 3334 (FM 3334) is located in southwestern Reeves County. It connects FM 2903 to SH 17 near Verhalen.

FM 3334 begins at FM 2903 between Balmorhea and Toyah. The 7.7-mile-long (12.4 km), two-lane road proceeds to the east ending two miles (3.2 km) south of Verhalen on SH 17 between Saragosa and Pecos.

FM 3334 was originally designated on May 7, 1974, from SH 17 to a point 5.1 miles (8.2 km) to the west. The route was extended to FM 2903 on May 27, 1976.

== FM 3335 ==
Farm to Market Road 3335
- Location: Wilson County
- Length: 6.938 mi (11.166 km)
- Existed: 1974–present

== FM 3336 ==
Farm to Market Road 3336
- Location: Live Oak County
- Length: 3.274 mi (5.269 km)
- Existed: 1974–present

== FM 3337 ==
Farm to Market Road 3337
- Location: Haskell County
- Length: 2.161 mi (3.478 km)
- Existed: March 27, 1997–present

=== FM 3337 (1974) ===
Farm to Market Road 3337
- Location: Cass County
- Existed: May 7, 1974–June 5, 1987

A previous route numbered FM 3337 was designated on May 7, 1974, from FM 251 south 2.7 miles (4.3 km) to FM 249 in Bloomburg. On September 29, 1977, the road was extended northwest 2.7 miles (4.3 km) from FM 251. On May 22, 1985, the road was extended 4.3 miles (6.9 km) north and northwest to FM 3129. FM 3337 was cancelled on June 5, 1987, by district request and transferred to FM 3129.

== FM 3338 ==
Farm to Market Road 3338
- Location: Webb County
- Length: 8.195 mi (13.189 km)
- Existed: 1974–present

Farm to Market Road 3338 (FM 3338) is located in Webb County. Its southern terminus is at FM 1472 (Mines Road) in northern Laredo. It runs northwest into unincorporated areas as Las Tiendas Road before reaching its northern terminus at SH 255. North of here, Las Tiendas Road continues as an unimproved road.

FM 3338 was designated on May 7, 1974, to run from FM 1472 to a point 4.0 miles (6.4 km) to the northwest. It was extended to its current northern terminus on November 25, 1975.

== FM 3339 ==
Farm to Market Road 3339
- Location: Fisher County
- Length: 4.785 mi (7.701 km)
- Existed: November 25, 1975–present

== FM 3340 ==
Farm to Market Road 3340
- Location: Hamilton County
- Length: 2.041 mi (3.285 km)
- Existed: November 25, 1975–present

== FM 3341 ==
Farm to Market Road 3341
- Location: Smith County
- Length: 1.500 mi (2.414 km)
- Existed: November 25, 1975–present

== FM 3342 ==
Farm to Market Road 3342
- Location: San Jacinto County
- Length: 1.598 mi (2.572 km)
- Existed: 1975–present

== FM 3343 ==
Farm to Market Road 3343
- Location: Shelby County
- Length: 2.079 mi (3.346 km)
- Existed: November 25, 1975–present

== FM 3344 ==
Farm to Market Road 3344
- Location: Jack County
- Length: 1.669 mi (2.686 km)
- Existed: April 28, 1994–present

=== FM 3344 (1975) ===
Farm to Market Road 3344
- Location: Brazoria County
- Existed: November 25, 1975–September 13, 1984

A previous route numbered FM 3344 was designated on November 25, 1975, from FM 518, west of FM 1128, west to proposed SH 288. FM 3344 was cancelled on September 13, 1984, by district request and transferred to FM 518 after it was rerouted.

== FM 3345 ==
Farm to Market Road 3345
- Location: Fort Bend County
- Length: 2.277 mi (3.664 km)
- Existed: 1975–present

Farm to Market Road 3345 (FM 3345) is located in Fort Bend County in Missouri City. The highway is known locally as Cartwright Road, which continues west to Dulles Avenue.

FM 3345 begins at an intersection with FM 1092 in the Quail Valley area. The highway travels in an eastern direction through a heavily suburban area, ending at an intersection with FM 2234.

FM 3345 was designated on November 25, 1975, along the current route. On June 27, 1995, the entire route was redesignated Urban Road 3345 (UR 3345). The designation reverted to FM 3345 with the elimination of the Urban Road system on November 15, 2018.

== FM 3346 ==
Farm to Market Road 3346
- Location: Waller County
- Length: 4.15 mi (6.68 km)
- Existed: 1975–present

== RM 3347 ==
Ranch to Market Road 3347
- Location: Blanco County
- Length: 7.631 mi (12.281 km)
- Existed: 1975–present

== RM 3348 ==
Ranch to Market Road 3348
- Location: Kinney County
- Length: 5.996 mi (9.650 km)
- Existed: March 27, 1978–present

=== RM 3348 (1975) ===
Ranch to Market Road 3348
- Location: Gillespie County
- Existed: November 25, 1975–September 28, 1977

A previous route numbered RM 3348 was designated on November 25, 1975. It was proposed to run from SH 16, 2 miles (3.2 km) east of Fredericksburg, southeast approximately 2.2 miles (3.5 km) to Goehmann Lane. However, the right-of-way was deemed too expensive, and Gillespie County officials withdrew their support for the route. The designation was cancelled on September 28, 1977.

== FM 3349 ==
Farm to Market Road 3349
- Location: Williamson County
- Length: 4.188 mi (6.740 km)
- Existed: 1975–present

Farm to Market Road 3349 (FM 3349) is located in Williamson County.

FM 3349 is a rural, two-lane route for its entire length. Its southern terminus is at FM 1660 in the community of Norman's Crossing. It travels north through unincorporated Williamson County before ending at an intersection with US 79 in Frame Switch, a tiny community of 20 people west of Taylor.

FM 3349 was designated on November 25, 1975, running south from US 79 in Frame Switch for approximately 2.3 miles (3.7 km). The designation was extended to the junction with FM 1660 on September 29, 1977.

== FM 3350 ==
Farm to Market Road 3350
- Location: Atascosa County
- Length: 5.323 mi (8.567 km)
- Existed: November 25, 1975–present

Farm to Market Road 3350 (FM 3350) is a 5.323-mile (8.567 km) state road in Atascosa County, that connects Texas State Highway 16 (north-northwest of Jourdanton) with U.S. Route 281 / Texas State Highway 97 in Pleasanton.

== FM 3351 ==
Farm to Market Road 3351
- Location: Bexar, Comal, and Kendall counties
- Length: 23.552 mi (37.903 km)
- Existed: November 25, 1975–present

Farm to Market Road 3351 (FM 3351) is a 23.5-mile-long (37.8 km) route in Bexar, Comal, and Kendall counties. It is known locally as Ralph Fair Road, Curry Creek Road, and Bergheim–Kendalia Road. The route begins in Leon Springs at an intersection with I-10. FM 3351 runs northward past Camp Stanley and through Fair Oaks Ranch, crossing Cibolo Creek. It continues northward to Bergheim, where it intersects SH 46, before ending at RM 473 in Kendalia.

FM 3351 was designated in Bexar County on November 25, 1975, from I-10 northward to the Comal County line. On April 26, 1979, it was extended north 0.1 miles (0.16 km) to a road intersection in Comal County. On February 26, 1986, it was extended north into Kendall County to FM 475 (later SH 46). On May 25, 1993, it was extended to its current northern terminus, replacing RM 3160.

Junction list

County	Location	mi	km	Destinations	Notes
Bexar	San Antonio	0.0	0.0	I-10 / US 87 – Boerne, San Antonio	Southern terminus; I-10 exit 550
Comal	No major junctions				
Kendall	Bergheim	11.8	19.0	SH 46 – Boerne, New Braunfels	
Kendall	Kendalia	23.6	38.0	RM 473 – Sisterdale, Twin Sisters	Northern terminus
1.000 mi = 1.609 km; 1.000 km = 0.621 mi

== FM 3352 ==
Farm to Market Road 3352
- Location: Frio County
- Length: 2.518 mi (4.052 km)
- Existed: 1975–present

== FM 3353 ==
Farm to Market Road 3353
- Location: Guadalupe County
- Length: 5.963 mi (9.597 km)
- Existed: 1975–present

== FM 3354 ==
Farm to Market Road 3354
- Location: Nueces County
- Length: 7.298 mi (11.745 km)
- Existed: 1975–present

== FM 3355 ==
Farm to Market Road 3355
- Location: Bee County
- Length: 6.491 mi (10.446 km)
- Existed: 1975–present

== FM 3356 ==
Farm to Market Road 3356
- Location: Collin and Grayson counties
- Length: 4.395 mi (7.073 km)
- Existed: 1975–present

== FM 3357 ==
Farm to Market Road 3357
- Location: Franklin County
- Length: 5.321 mi (8.563 km)
- Existed: 1976–present

=== FM 3357 (1975) ===
Farm to Market Road 3357
- Location: Denton County
- Existed: November 25, 1975–February 1976

The original FM 3357 was designated on November 25, 1975, to run from FM 407 in Bartonville south 2.0 miles (3.2 km) to FM 1171 in Shiloh. This route was cancelled 90 days after designation.

== FM 3358 ==
Farm to Market Road 3358
- Location: Upshur County
- Length: 4.087 mi (6.577 km)
- Existed: September 6, 1985–present

=== FM 3358 (1975) ===
Farm to Market Road 3358
- Location: Navarro County
- Existed: November 25, 1975–February 28, 1977

The first use of the FM 3358 designation was in Navarro County as a 4.0 miles (6.4 km) loop off FM 416 from 6.5 miles (10.5 km) northeast of Streetman to near Winkler. FM 3358 was cancelled on February 28, 1977, and removed from the highway system in exchange for creation of FM 3383.

=== FM 3358 (1978) ===
Farm to Market Road 3358
- Location: Armstrong County
- Existed: April 25, 1978–December 15, 1983

The next use of the FM 3358 designation was in Armstrong County, from FM 2301, 3 miles (4.8 km) south of Wayside, west 4.7 miles (7.6 km) to the Randall County line. FM 3358 was cancelled on December 15, 1983, by district request and transferred to FM 1075.

== FM 3359 ==
Farm to Market Road 3359
- Location: Panola County
- Length: 6.561 mi (10.559 km)
- Existed: 1975–present

== FM 3360 ==
Farm to Market Road 3360
- Location: Chambers County
- Existed: November 25, 1975–June 30, 2016

Farm to Market Road 3360 (FM 3360) was located in Chambers County. No highway currently uses the FM 3360 designation.

FM 3360 was designated on November 25, 1975, from SH 146, 1.4 miles (2.3 km) north of FM 1942, southeast 2.3 miles (3.7 km) to FM 565. FM 3360 was cancelled on June 30, 2016, and returned to the city of Mont Belvieu.

== FM 3361 ==
Farm to Market Road 3361
- Location: Liberty County
- Length: 1.026 mi (1.651 km)
- Existed: 1975–present

== FM 3362 ==
Farm to Market Road 3362
- Location: Hidalgo County
- Length: 7.415 mi (11.933 km)
- Existed: 1975–present

== FM 3363 ==
Farm to Market Road 3363
- Location: Eastland County
- Length: 1.673 mi (2.692 km)
- Existed: 1975–present

== FM 3364 ==
Farm to Market Road 3364
- Location: Collin County
- Length: 2.715 mi (4.369 km)
- Existed: 1976–present

Farm to Market Road 3364 (FM 3364) is located in Collin County. The highway runs from FM 982 south of Princeton eastward and southward to County Road 1083 near Lavon Lake.

== FM 3365 ==
Farm to Market Road 3365
- Location: Briscoe County
- Length: 4.874 mi (7.844 km)
- Existed: 1975–present

== FM 3366 ==
Farm to Market Road 3366
- Location: Young County
- Length: 1.842 mi (2.964 km)
- Existed: 1976–present

Farm to Market Route 3366 (FM 3366) is a 1.8-mile-long (2.9 km) route located in Young County. The road begins at SH 79 southwest of Olney and travels northward before ending at FM 210. It passes to the east of Olney Municipal Airport.

FM 3366 was designated on May 25, 1976, along its current route.

== FM 3367 ==
Farm to Market Road 3367
- Location: Roberts County
- Length: 8.657 mi (13.932 km)
- Existed: 1976–present

== FM 3368 ==
Farm to Market Road 3368
- Location: Jones County
- Length: 1.959 mi (3.153 km)
- Existed: 1976–present

== FM 3369 ==
Farm to Market Road 3369
- Location: Bell County
- Length: 6.833 mi (10.997 km)
- Existed: 1976–present

== FM 3370 ==
Farm to Market Road 3370
- Location: Hill County
- Length: 4.046 mi (6.511 km)
- Existed: 1976–present

== FM 3371 ==
Farm to Market Road 3371
- Location: Limestone County
- Length: 9.171 mi (14.759 km)
- Existed: 1976–present

== FM 3372 ==
Farm to Market Road 3372
- Location: Anderson County
- Length: 1.385 mi (2.229 km)
- Existed: 1976–present

== FM 3373 ==
Farm to Market Road 3373
- Location: Angelina County
- Length: 1.231 mi (1.981 km)
- Existed: 1976–present

== FM 3374 ==
Farm to Market Road 3374
- Location: Howard County
- Length: 2.500 mi (4.023 km)
- Existed: April 23, 1997–present

=== FM 3374 (1976) ===
Farm to Market Road 3374
- Location: Montgomery County
- Existed: July 15, 1976–February 23, 1989

A previous route numbered FM 3374 was designated on July 15, 1976, from Loop 336 and SH 105 west of Conroe south 1.1 miles (1.8 km) to FM 2854. FM 3374 was cancelled by district request on February 23, 1989, and was redesignated as an extension of Loop 336.

== FM 3375 ==
Farm to Market Road 3375
- Location: Falls County
- Length: 3.055 mi (4.917 km)
- Existed: October 21, 1981–present

Farm to Market Road 3375 (FM 3375) is located in Falls County.

FM 3375 begins at an intersection with FM 147 near McClanahan. The highway travels in a generally northwest direction through rural farming areas, ending at an intersection with FM 2307 northeast of Marlin.

The current FM 3375 was designated on October 21, 1981, along its current route.

=== FM 3375 (1976) ===
Farm to Market Road 3375
- Location: Bexar County
- Existed: May 25, 1976–May 22, 1979

A previous route numbered FM 3375 was designated on May 25, 1976, running from FM 1976 in Converse northeastward to FM 1604 in Universal City at a distance of 1.5 miles (2.4 km). The highway was cancelled on May 22, 1979, when FM 1976 was rerouted. The old route of FM 1976 was redesignated as a spur connection of FM 1976 (this spur connection became FM 3502, which was cancelled due to the rerouting of FM 1516).

== FM 3376 ==
Farm to Market Road 3376
- Location: Jim Wells County
- Length: 4.359 mi (7.015 km)
- Existed: 1976–present

== FM 3377 ==
Farm to Market Road 3377
- Location: San Patricio County
- Length: 1.898 mi (3.055 km)
- Existed: 1976–present

== FM 3378 ==
Farm to Market Road 3378
- Location: Bowie County
- Length: 3.383 mi (5.444 km)
- Existed: 1976–present

== FM 3379 ==
Farm to Market Road 3379
- Location: Harrison County
- Length: 1.799 mi (2.895 km)
- Existed: 1976–present

== FM 3380 ==
Farm to Market Road 3380
- Location: El Paso County
- Length: 7.1 mi (11.4 km)
- Existed: July 29, 1993–present

Farm to Market Road 3380 (FM 3380) is located in El Paso County. It connects I-10 to the border with Mexico at the Tornillo–Guadalupe International Bridge and the Marcelino Serna Port of Entry.

The current FM 3380 was designated in 1993, running from I-10 southwestward to SH 20 in Tornillo. In 2012, the highway was extended southwestward to the Tornillo–Guadalupe International Bridge at the Marcelino Serna Port of Entry.

Junction list

The entire route is in El Paso County.

Location	mi	km	Destinations	Notes
Marcelino Serna Port of Entry	0.0	0.0	Tornillo–Guadalupe International Bridge over the Rio Grande	
	1.2	1.9	To FM 76 (via Lower Island Road)	
Tornillo	2.9	4.7	SH 20 (Alameda Avenue)	Interchange
	7.1	11.4	I-10	I-10 exit 55
1.000 mi = 1.609 km; 1.000 km = 0.621 mi

=== FM 3380 (1976) ===
Farm to Market Road 3380
- Location: Cameron County
- Existed: May 25, 1976–April 15, 1992

A previous route numbered FM 3380 was designated on May 25, 1976, from US 281 east of Los Indios south 1.5 miles (2.4 km) to the then-proposed New International Bridge at the Rio Grande. FM 3380 was cancelled on April 15, 1992, and transferred to FM 509.

== FM 3381 ==
Farm to Market Road 3381
- Location: Comanche County
- Length: 5.839 mi (9.397 km)
- Existed: 1976–present

== FM 3382 ==
Farm to Market Road 3382
- Location: Sabine County
- Length: 7.037 mi (11.325 km)
- Existed: 1976–present

== FM 3383 ==
Farm to Market Road 3383
- Location: Navarro County
- Length: 6.525 mi (10.501 km)
- Existed: 1977–present

== FM 3384 ==
Farm to Market Road 3384
- Location: Camp County
- Length: 4.587 mi (7.382 km)
- Existed: 1977–present

== FM 3385 ==
Farm to Market Road 3385
- Location: Crosby County
- Length: 3.546 mi (5.707 km)
- Existed: 1977–present

== FM 3386 ==
Farm to Market Road 3386
- Location: Nueces County
- Length: 3.359 mi (5.406 km)
- Existed: 1977–present

== FM 3387 ==
Farm to Market Road 3387
- Location: Atascosa County
- Length: 6.174 mi (9.936 km)
- Existed: 1977–present

== FM 3388 ==
Farm to Market Road 3388
- Location: Delta County
- Length: 2.682 mi (4.316 km)
- Existed: 1977–present

== FM 3389 ==
Farm to Market Road 3389
- Location: Hopkins County
- Length: 6.999 mi (11.264 km)
- Existed: 1977–present

Farm to Market Road 3389 (FM 3389) is located in Hopkins County. The highway runs from FM 1567 near Greenview northward to I-30/US 67 near Brashear.

== FM 3390 ==
Farm to Market Road 3390
- Location: Red River County
- Length: 2.755 mi (4.434 km)
- Existed: 1977–present

== FM 3391 ==
Farm to Market Road 3391
- Location: Johnson County
- Length: 3.896 mi (6.270 km)
- Existed: 1977–present

== FM 3392 ==
Farm to Market Road 3392
- Location: Clay County
- Length: 2.857 mi (4.598 km)
- Existed: 1977–present

== FM 3393 ==
Farm to Market Road 3393
- Location: Wichita and Clay counties
- Length: 4.283 mi (6.893 km)
- Existed: 1977–present

== FM 3394 ==
Farm to Market Road 3394
- Location: Montague County
- Length: 1.951 mi (3.140 km)
- Existed: 1977–present

Farm to Market Road 3394 (FM 3394) is located in north-central Montague County. It is approximately 2 miles (3.2 km) in length.

FM 3394 begins at an intersection with FM 1759 north of Nocona, heading north on a two-lane undivided road, and passes Molsbee Cemetery. The FM 3394 designation ends farther to the north, with the roadway continuing north as Hinton Road.

FM 3394 was designated on September 29, 1977, along its current route.

== FM 3395 ==
Farm to Market Road 3395
- Location: Moore and Hutchinson counties
- Length: 5.386 mi (8.668 km)
- Existed: 1977–present

== FM 3396 ==
Farm to Market Road 3396
- Location: Kaufman County
- Length: 5.223 mi (8.406 km)
- Existed: September 26, 1979–present

Farm to Market Road 3396 (FM 3396) is located in Kaufman County. It begins at FM 2613 in Styx and runs east to SH 274 at Tolosa.

=== FM 3396 (1977) ===
Farm to Market Road 3396
- Location: Lipscomb County
- Existed: September 29, 1977–May 18, 1978

A previous route numbered FM 3396 was designated on September 29, 1977, from FM 1920, 4.9 miles (7.9 km) west of SH 305, to a point 4.2 miles (6.8 km) west. On May 18, 1978, FM 3396 was cancelled and became a portion of RM 3260.

== FM 3397 ==
Farm to Market Road 3397
- Location: Bailey County
- Length: 8.317 mi (13.385 km)
- Existed: 1977–present

Farm to Market Road 3397 (FM 3397) is located in Bailey County. It begins at FM 298 at Circle Back and continues south to FM 54.

== FM 3398 ==
Farm to Market Road 3398
- Location: Reeves and Ward counties
- Length: 3.528 mi (5.678 km)
- Existed: 1977–present

Farm to Market Road 3398 (FM 3398) is located in northeastern Reeves County and western Ward County.

FM 3398 begins at FM 1216 three miles (4.8 km) north of Pecos in Reeves County. The two-lane road proceeds to the east and crosses the Pecos River before entering Ward County. The route turns to the northeast and intersects FM 873 before ending at FM 516 northwest of Barstow.

FM 3398 was designated along its present alignment on September 29, 1977.

== FM 3399 ==
Farm to Market Road 3399
- Location: Coke County
- Length: 2.164 mi (3.483 km)
- Existed: September 29, 1977–present

Farm to Market Road 3399 (FM 3399) is located in Coke County. It begins at SH 70 and runs along the southern shore of the Oak Creek Reservoir.

FM 3399 was designated on September 29, 1977, along the current route.
