= Scenic Oaks, Texas =

- Census-designated place
- Coordinates: 29°42′0″N 98°39′49″W
- Country: United States
- State: Texas
- County: Bexar

Area
  - Total: 7.87 sq mi (20.38 km^{2})
  - Land: 7.85 sq mi (20.33 km^{2})
  - Water: 0.019 sq mi (0.05 km^{2})
- Elevation: 1,326 ft (404 m)

Population (2020)
  - Total: 10,458
  - Density: 1,332/sq mi (514.4/km^{2})
- Time zone: UTC-6 (Central (CST))
  - Summer (DST): UTC-5 (CDT)
- Zip Code: 78255, 78006
- FIPS code: 48-66089
- GNIS feature ID: 1867564
- ANSI Code: 2409290

Scenic Oaks is a census-designated place (CDP) in Bexar County, Texas, United States. It is part of the San Antonio Metropolitan Statistical Area. The population was 10,458 at the 2020 census, up from 4,957 at the 2010 census.

== Geography ==
Scenic Oaks is located in northern Bexar County. It is bordered by Interstate 10 to the east, by the city of San Antonio to the southeast, by the CDP of Cross Mountain to the south, and to the north by Balcones Creek, forming the border with Kendall County. A portion of the CDP is taken up by the gated community of Scenic Oaks. Via Interstate 10 it is 25 miles (40 km) south to downtown San Antonio and 8 miles (13 km) northwest to Boerne.

According to the United States Census Bureau, the Scenic Oaks CDP has a total area of 7.9 square miles (20.4 km^{2}), of which 0.019 square miles (0.05 km^{2}), or 0.24%, is water.

== Demographics ==
Historical population
Census	Pop.	Note	%±
1990	2,352		—
2000	3,279		39.4%
2010	4,957		51.2%
2020	10,458		111.0%
U.S. Decennial Census; 1850–1900 1910; 1920 1930 1940; 1950 1960 1970; 1980 1990 2000; 2010

Scenic Oaks first appeared as a census designated place in the 1990 U.S. census.

=== Racial and ethnic composition ===
Scenic Oaks CDP, Texas – Racial and ethnic composition Note: the US Census treats Hispanic/Latino as an ethnic category. This table excludes Latinos from the racial categories and assigns them to a separate category. Hispanics/Latinos may be of any race.
Race / Ethnicity (NH = Non-Hispanic)	Pop 2000	Pop 2010	Pop 2020	% 2000	% 2010	% 2020
White alone (NH)	2,707	3,558	5,908	82.56%	71.78%	56.49%
Black or African American alone (NH)	6	32	270	0.18%	0.65%	2.58%
Native American or Alaska Native alone (NH)	11	8	16	0.34%	0.16%	0.15%
Asian alone (NH)	30	104	580	0.91%	2.10%	5.55%
Native Hawaiian or Pacific Islander alone (NH)	0	3	15	0.00%	0.06%	0.14%
Other race alone (NH)	1	1	35	0.03%	0.02%	0.33%
Mixed race or Multiracial (NH)	33	69	329	1.01%	1.39%	3.15%
Hispanic or Latino (any race)	491	1,182	3,305	14.97%	23.85%	31.60%
Total	3,279	4,957	10,458	100.00%	100.00%	100.00%

=== 2020 census ===
As of the 2020 census, Scenic Oaks had a population of 10,458. The median age was 39.6 years. 28.0% of residents were under the age of 18 and 14.6% of residents were 65 years of age or older. For every 100 females there were 97.0 males, and for every 100 females age 18 and over there were 97.3 males age 18 and over.

100.0% of residents lived in urban areas, while 0.0% lived in rural areas.

There were 3,498 households in Scenic Oaks, of which 43.4% had children under the age of 18 living in them. Of all households, 73.8% were married-couple households, 9.7% were households with a male householder and no spouse or partner present, and 12.8% were households with a female householder and no spouse or partner present. About 12.1% of all households were made up of individuals and 5.0% had someone living alone who was 65 years of age or older.

There were 3,695 housing units, of which 5.3% were vacant. The homeowner vacancy rate was 1.8% and the rental vacancy rate was 12.9%.

=== 2000 census ===
As of the 2000 census, there were 3,279 people, 1,190 households, and 996 families residing in the CDP. The population density was 393.7 inhabitants per square mile (152.0/km^{2}). There were 1,226 housing units at an average density of 147.2 per square mile (56.8/km^{2}). The racial makeup of the CDP was 93.69% White, 0.18% African American, 0.34% Native American, 0.95% Asian, 3.42% from other races, and 1.43% from two or more races. Hispanic or Latino of any race were 14.97% of the population.

There were 1,190 households, out of which 36.6% had children under the age of 18 living with them, 75.7% were married couples living together, 5.8% had a female householder with no husband present, and 16.3% were non-families. 14.5% of all households were made up of individuals, and 4.8% had someone living alone who was 65 years of age or older. The average household size was 2.76 and the average family size was 3.05.

In the CDP, the population was spread out, with 25.8% under the age of 18, 4.8% from 18 to 24, 24.0% from 25 to 44, 35.2% from 45 to 64, and 10.1% who were 65 years of age or older. The median age was 43 years. For every 100 females, there were 97.1 males. For every 100 females age 18 and over, there were 94.0 males.

The median income for a household in the CDP was $88,127, and the median income for a family was $97,948. Males had a median income of $60,882 versus $42,353 for females. The per capita income for the CDP was $34,980. About 3.2% of families and 3.8% of the population were below the poverty line, including 4.8% of those under age 18 and 2.9% of those age 65 or over.

== Education ==
Scenic Oaks is served by both the Northside Independent School District and Boerne Independent School District.

The NISD portion is zoned to:

- Aue Elementary School
- Rawlinson Middle School (San Antonio)
- Tom C. Clark High School

Zoned schools of the BISD part include: Kendall Elementary School and Von Raub Elementary School in two different parts, Boerne Middle School South, and Boerne Champion High School.
