= Kendalia, Texas =

Unincorporated community in Kendall County, Texas

- Unincorporated community
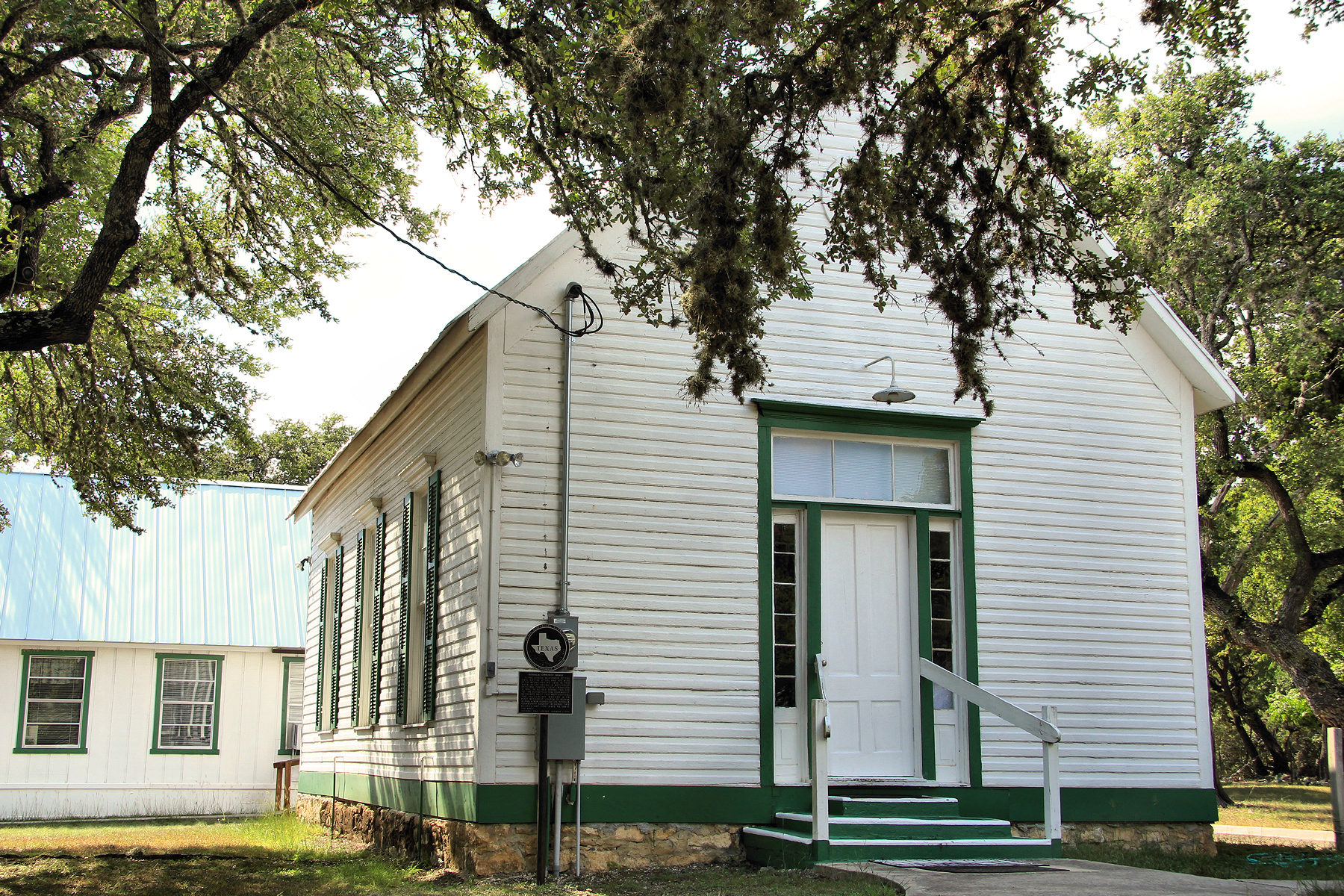
- The historic Kendalia Community Church

- Location in Texas and the United States Kendalia (the United States)
- Coordinates: 29°58′9″N 98°31′20″W
- Country: United States
- State: Texas
- County: Kendall
- Named for: George Wilkins Kendall
- Elevation: 1,384 ft (422 m)
- Time zone: UTC-6 (Central (CST))
  - Summer (DST): UTC-5 (CDT)
- ZIP codes: 78027
- GNIS feature ID: 1339027

Kendalia is an unincorporated community in northeastern Kendall County, Texas, United States. It is part of the Texas-German belt.

== Geography ==
Kendalia lies at the intersection of RM 473 and FM 3351 northeast of the city of Boerne, the county seat of Kendall County. Its elevation is 1,384 feet (422 m). Although Kendalia is unincorporated, it has a post office, with the ZIP code of 78027; the ZCTA for ZIP Code 78027 had a population of 459 at the 2010 census. The community is part of the San Antonio Metropolitan Statistical Area.

== History ==
Likely named for early nearby settler George Wilkins Kendall, the community was surveyed in 1883, although a post office was not established until 1895. The local economy has long been dependent primarily on ranching, although many residents today work in cities such as Blanco or San Antonio.

The Holy Archangels Greek Orthodox Monastery was founded by Elder Ephraim of Arizona in 1996 in the vicinity of Kendalia.

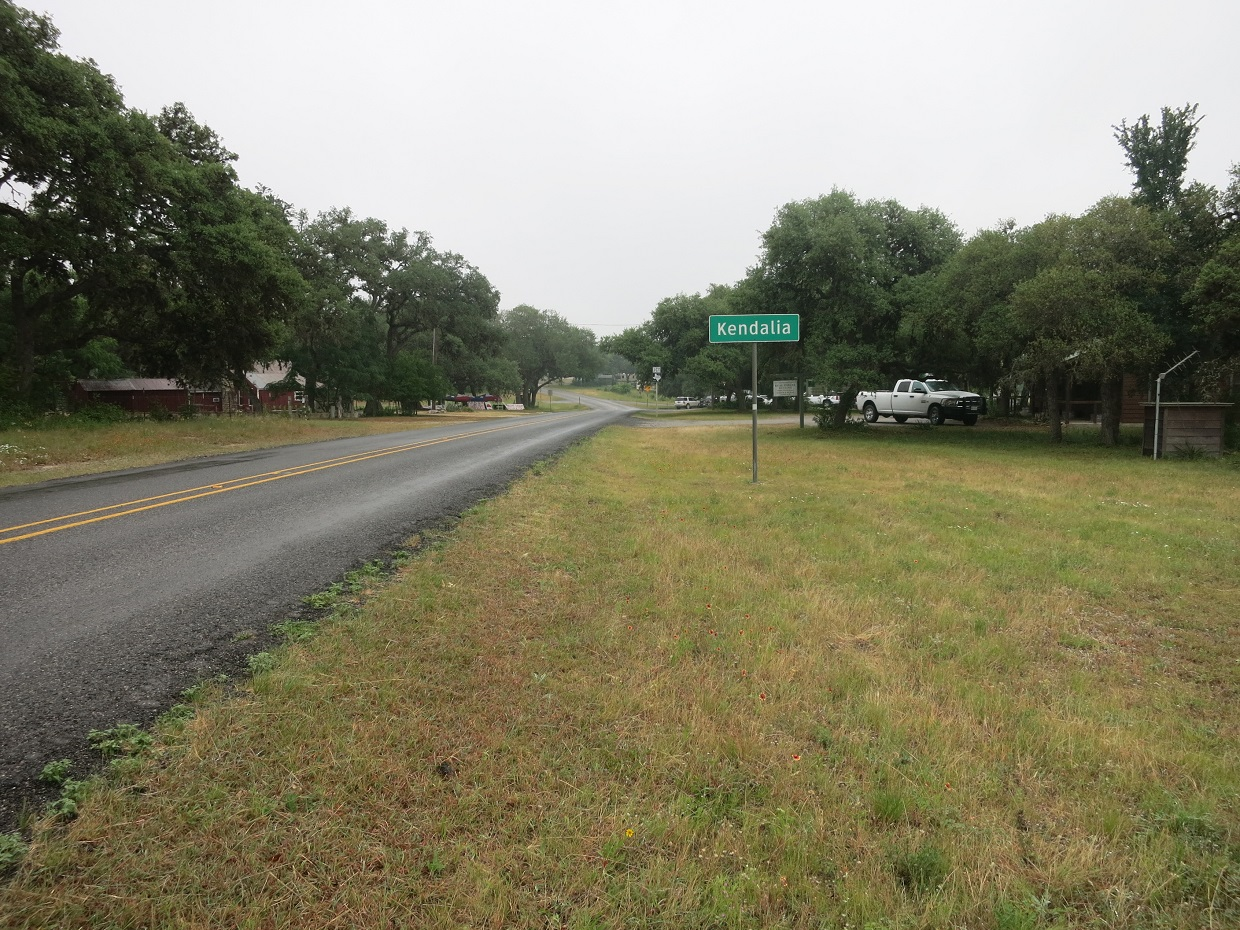
Kendalia sign on Ranch to Market Road 473 looking south

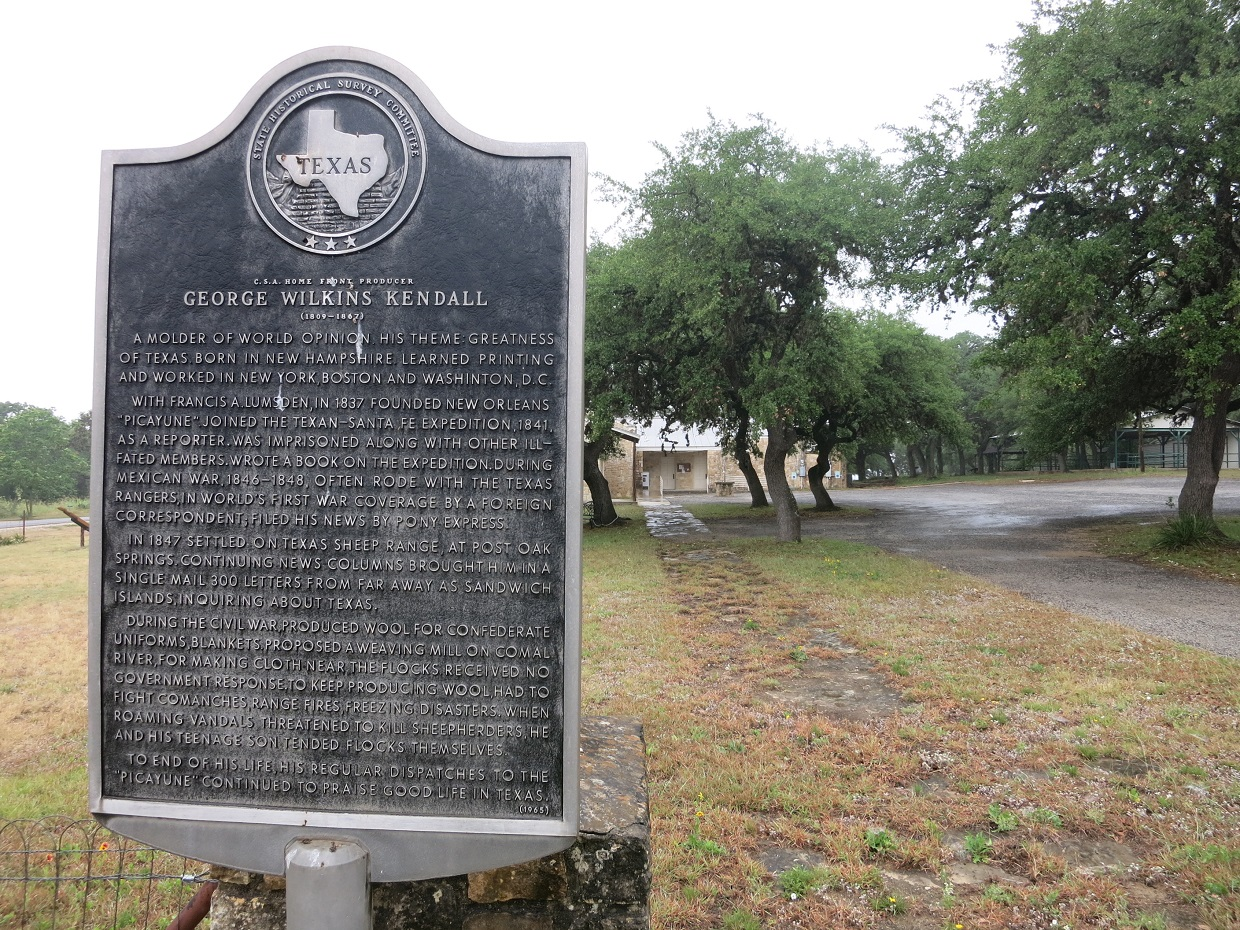
George Wilkins Kendall state historical marker

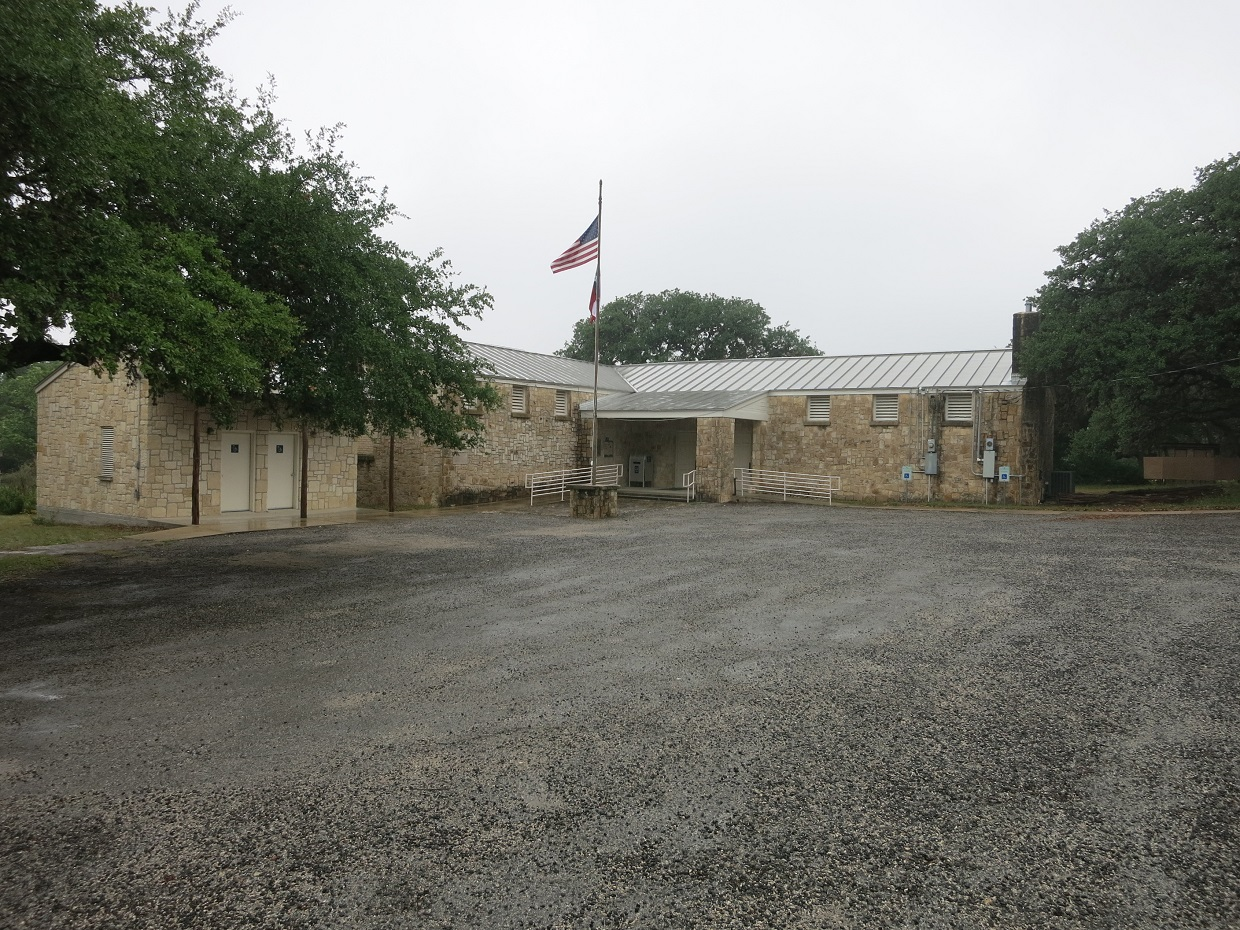
Kendalia Library on Ranch to Market Road 473

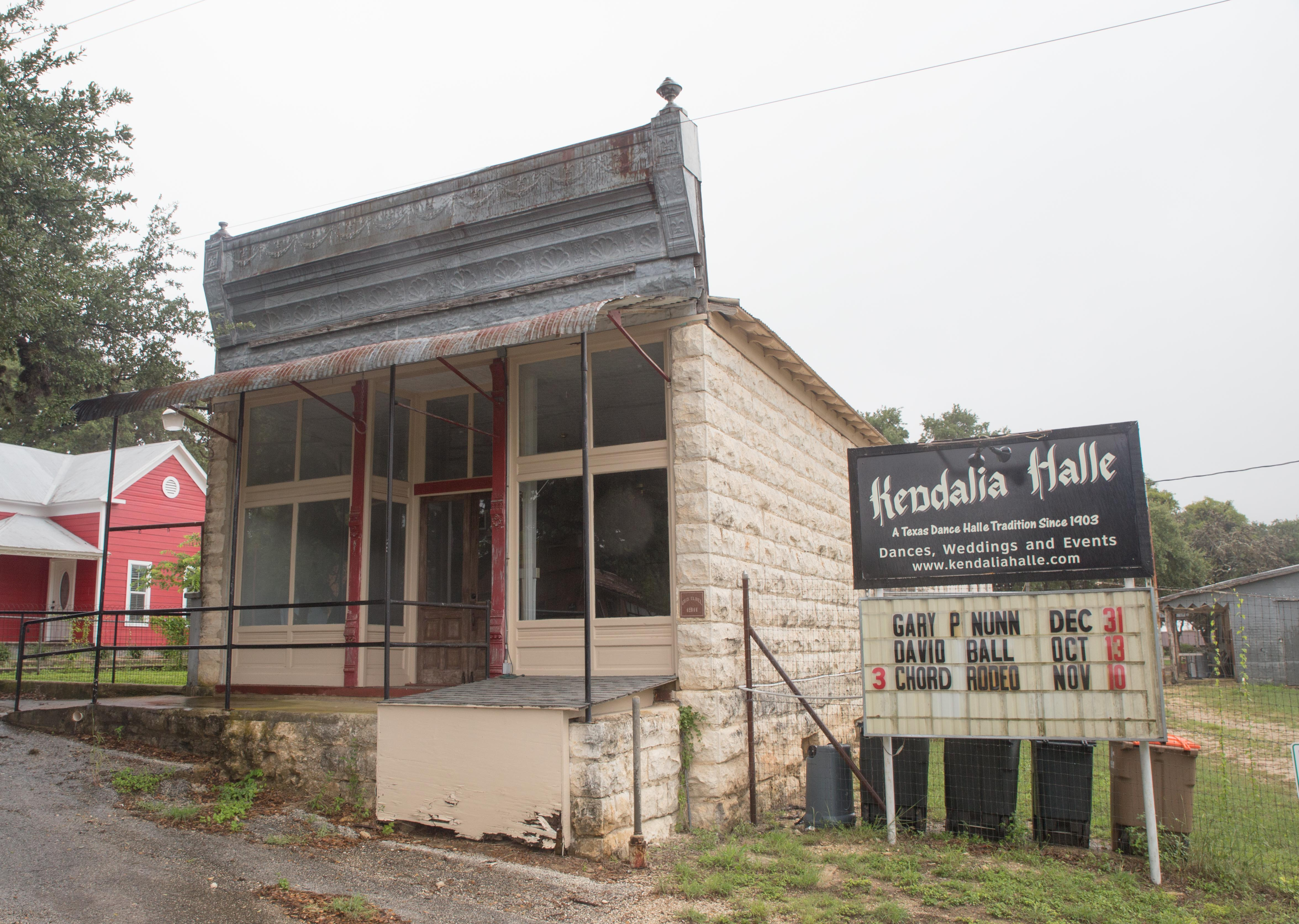
Elbel Building

== Major highways ==
- Ranch to Market Road 473
- Farm to Market Road 3351
