= Boerne High School =

Public school in Texas, United States

Coordinates: 29.7989°N 98.7094°W

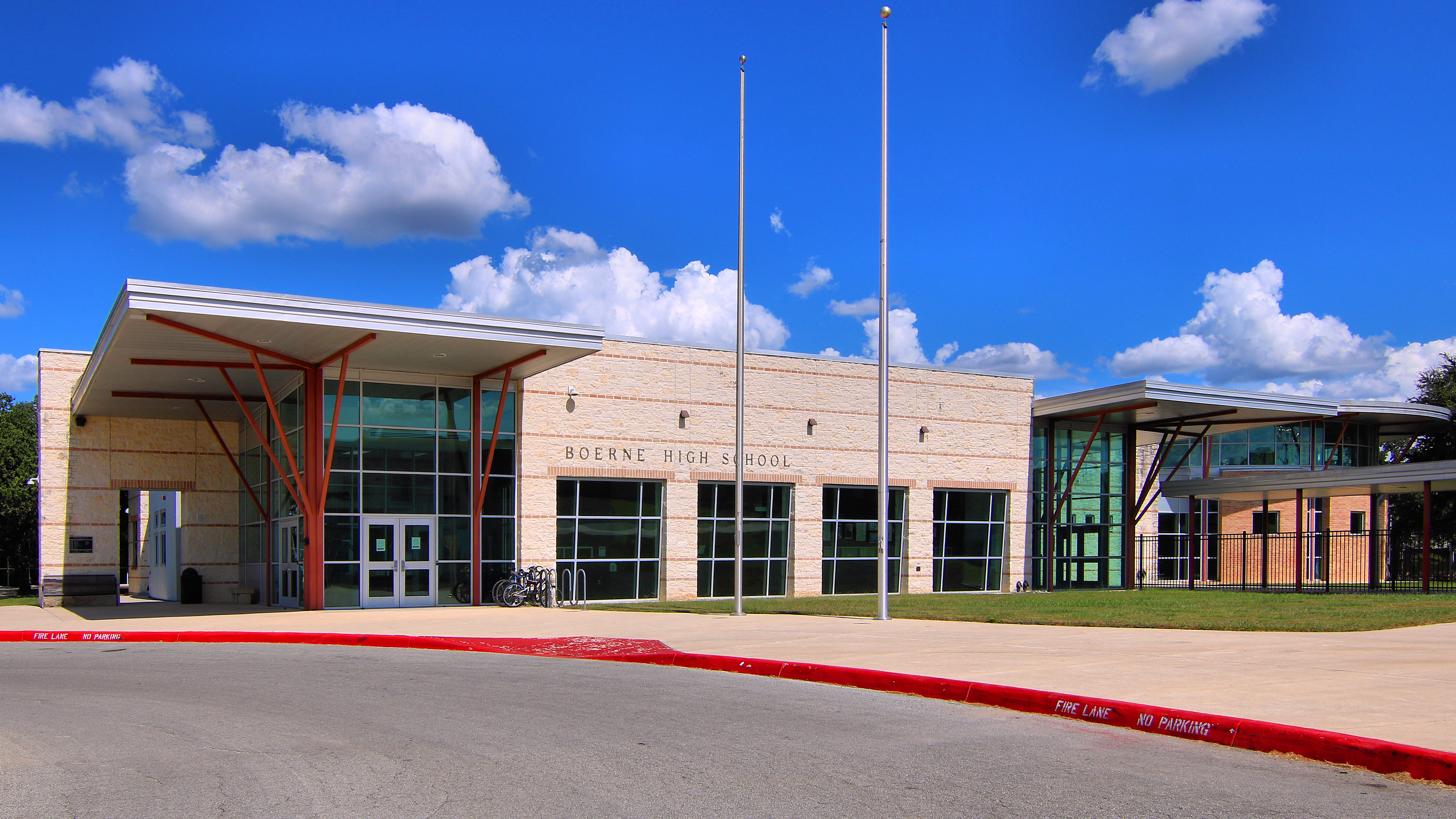
- 1 Greyhound Lane; Boerne, Texas 78006; United States

Information
- Type: Public, secondary
- Motto: "BHS - Building Higher Standards"
- School district: Boerne Independent School District
- Principal: Matt Myers
- Teaching staff: 92.07 (FTE)
- Grades: 9-12
- Enrollment: 1,426 (2023–2024)
- Student to teacher ratio: 15.49
- Colors: Purple, white, and gray
- Athletics conference: UIL Class 5A Football and Basketball
- Mascot: Greyhound
- Website: bhs.boerneisd.net

Boerne High School is a public high school located in the hill country just 30 miles northwest of San Antonio in Boerne, Texas, USA. The high school used to be the only high school in Boerne which now has a second high school, Boerne Samuel V. Champion High School. The "original" Boerne High School currently serves as Boerne Middle School North.

== General information ==
The school serves Kendall County and the surrounding areas of IH-10 such as, Cordillera Ranch, Bergheim and Sisterdale. Since the opening of Boerne Samuel V. Champion High School, all students living north of HW-46 attend BHS, while all students living south of HW-46 attend CHS. Boerne is known for its academics and athletics.

== Feeder schools ==
Curington Elementary (K-5), Fabra Elementary (K-5), half of Cibolo Creek Elementary (K-5), half of Mark T. Voss Middle School (6-8), and Boerne Middle School North. (6-8)

== Athletics ==
The athletic department, led by BISD A.D. Coach Stan Leech, excels in nearly every sport at Boerne. The Greyhounds, regardless of what sport, usually make deep runs in the playoffs, with almost all of the teams making it to at least the Regional finals in the last five years. The football, baseball, soccer, basketball, cross country, tennis and softball teams have all reached regionals within the past 5 years. The softball team won state in 2007 and Boys' soccer won state in 2006, 2021 and 2022. Also, the football team reached regionals in 2005, the state semi-finals in 2004, and the state title game in 2022. Baseball and cross country both won state in 2004.

== History ==
The school was closed and renovated in 2008-2009, and re-opened for the 2009-2010 year. During the 2008-2009 school year, all tenth, eleventh and twelfth grade students in the Boerne area attended Champion High School. Ninth grade students continued to attend the Boerne Middle Schools for this year. At the start of the 2009-2010 school year, both BHS and CHS housed Boerne ISD's 9-12th graders, while BMSS and BMSN housed 7-8th graders again. Now, Boerne Middle School South feeds into Champion High School and Boerne Middle School North feeds into Boerne High School.

== Notable alumni ==
- Michelle Beadle (1994) - sports broadcaster
- Quinten Dormady (2015) – American football quarterback
- Maggie Lindemann – American singer-songwriter
- Cole Phillips (2022) - baseball player

== See also ==
- List of high schools in Texas
