= Van Alstyne High School =

Location
- 700 Collin McKinney Parkway; Van Alstyne, Grayson County, Texas 75495; United States
- Coordinates: 33.4145°N 96.59792°W

Information
- Type: Public High School
- School district: Van Alstyne Independent School District
- NCES School ID: 484389004982
- Principal: Krista Beal
- Staff: 50.68 (FTE)
- Grades: 9-12
- Enrollment: 729 (2024-2025)
- Student to teacher ratio: 14.38
- Campus type: Town
- Colors: Blue & White
- Athletics conference: UIL 4A
- Mascot: Panther
- Website: hs.vanalstyneisd.org

Van Alstyne High School (also known as VAHS) is a public high school located in Van Alstyne, Texas. It is a UIL 4A school and the only high school in Van Alstyne Independent School District. As of the 2023-2024 school year, the school has an enrollment of 672 students.

In 2024, Van Alstyne High School moved to its current campus just south of Grayson College in order to accommodate growth in student population. The TEA gave VAHS an overall rating of A in 2022.

== Academics ==
=== Curriculum ===
Van Alstyne High School offers AP Classes such as AP English Literature, AP English Language, AP Calculus, AP Spanish, and AP Chemistry. In addition, VAHS offers honors classes in math, science, english, and social studies as well as duel credit enrollment at Grayson College. VAHS also offers Career and Technical Education Program allowing students to choose from 14 Programs of Study.

=== Enrollment ===
As of the 2023-2024 school year, Van Alstyne High School has an enrollment of 672 students and 44.42 teachers (FTE) for a student to teacher ratio of 15.13. Around 21.28% of Van Alstyne High School students are eligible for free and reduced lunch. In term of demographics, Van Alstyne High School is 66.37% White, 20.83% Hispanic, 3.27% Asian, 2.38% African American, 1.34% American Indian/Alaska Native, and 5.8% two or more races.

== Athletics ==
In 2001, VAHS advanced to the 2A state championship in football but were defeated by Blanco High School. In 2024, Van Alstyne Football won its first district title since 2018 and advanced to playoffs. They went on to defeat Ferris High School but were later defeated by Van High School.

Van Alstyne High School competes in the following sports:

- Football
- Basketball
- Volleyball
- Softball
- Baseball
- Cross Country
- Track and Field
- Powerlifting
- Golf
- Tennis

== Fine Arts ==
Van Alstyne High School participates in the following fine arts:

- Band
- Theatre
- Choir

== Notable alumni ==
- Bill Hughes, football player
- Buzz Williams, basketball coach
