= Blanco High School =

Location
- 1215 Fourth Street; Blanco, Blanco County, Texas 78606; United States; 30.0993°N 98.4315°W

Information
- School type: Public, high school
- Locale: Rural: Distant
- School district: Blanco ISD
- NCES School ID: 481032000515
- Principal: Jacob Raley
- Teaching staff: 28.52 (on an FTE basis)
- Grades: 9‍–‍12
- Enrollment: 349 (2025‍–‍2026)
- Student to teacher ratio: 12.55
- Colors: Blue & Gold
- Athletics conference: UIL Class 3A
- Mascot: Panther/Lady Panther
- Website: Blanco High School

Blanco High School is a public high school located in Blanco, Texas (USA) and classified as a 3A school by the University Interscholastic League. It is part of the Blanco Independent School District that serves students in southern Blanco County. During 2022‍–‍2023, Blanco High School had an enrollment of 355 students and a student to teacher ratio of 12.40. The school received an overall rating of "A" from the Texas Education Agency for the 2024‍–‍2025 school year.

== Athletics ==
The Blanco Panthers compete in the following sports

- Baseball
- Basketball
- Cross Country
- Football
- Golf
- Powerlifting
- Softball
- Tennis
- Track and Field
- Volleyball

=== State titles ===
- Football
  - 2001(2A/D1)

== Notable alumni ==
- Willie Upshaw - former Major League Baseball player and coach
