= Van Alstyne Independent School District =

School district in Texas

Address
- 1096 N. Waco Street Van Alstyne, TX, USA ESC Region 10
- Coordinates: 33°25′45″N 96°34′59″W

District information
- Type: Independent School District
- Motto: Home of the Panthers!
- Grades: PK-12
- Superintendent: Dr. David Brown
- Governing agency: Texas Education Agency
- Schools: 6
- NCES District ID: 4843890

Students and staff
- Students: 2,857 (2025-26)
- Athletic conference: UIL Class AAAA
- District mascot: Panthers
- Colors: Blue & White

Other information
- Website: www.vanalstyneisd.org

Van Alstyne Independent School District (Van Alstyne ISD, VAISD) is a public school district based in Van Alstyne, Texas, United States. Covering 63 square miles, the district is primarily located in southern Grayson County, with a small portion extending into northern Collin County, and serves the City of Van Alstyne and surrounding areas.

As of 2026, Van Alstyne ISD operates six campuses, including one high school, two middle schools, and four elementary schools. The district most recently received a B rating from the Texas Education Agency (TEA).

== History ==
For many years prior to 2018, Van Alstyne ISD had 3 campuses Van Alstyne High School with grades 9-12, Van Alstyne Middle School with grades 5-8, and Van Alstyne Elementary School with grades PK-4.

2018 - Bob and Lola Sanford Elementary School opens with grades PK-4. Van Alstyne Elementary is renamed John and Nelda Partin Elementary and houses grades K-4.

2024 - Van Alstyne High School moves to a new campus. Van Alstyne Junior High moves to the previous high school building with grades 7-8. Van Alstyne Middle School opens in the former VAJH building, housing grades 5-6.

== Schools ==
School name	Grades	Year Founded	Additional information
Van Alstyne High School	9-12		Current campus opened in 2024.
Van Alstyne Junior High School	7-8		Former VAHS campus.
Van Alstyne Middle School	5-6	2024	Former VAJH campus.
John and Nelda Partin Elementary School	PK-4		Renamed from Van Alstyne Elementary School in 2018. Grades PK-5 until 2018; K-5 2019-2024; K-4 2024-2025
Bob and Lola Sanford Elementary School	PK-4	2018	Grades PK-5 from 2018-2024
Charles and Beth Williams Elementary School	PK-4	2026	

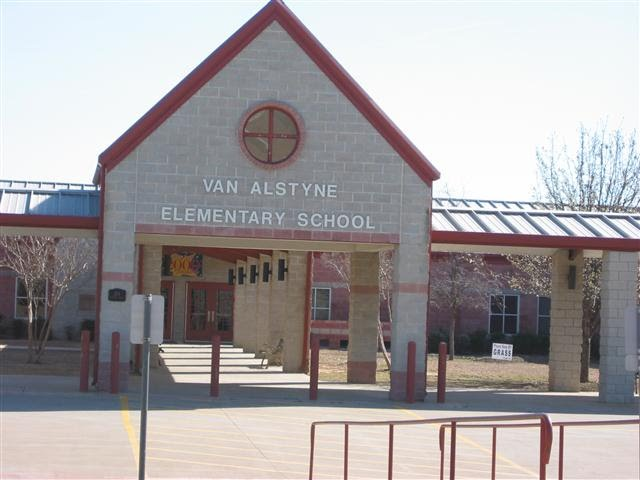
Van Alstyne Elementary School
