= Fair Oaks Ranch, Texas =

- City
- Motto: "Where Community Spirit Overflows!"
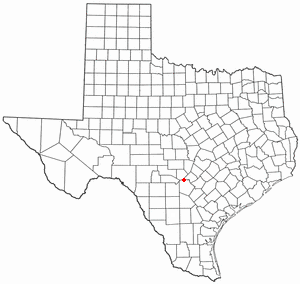
- Location of Fair Oaks Ranch, Texas

- Coordinates: 29°45′14″N 98°38′03″W
- Country: United States
- State: Texas
- Counties: Bexar, Kendall, Comal

Area
  - Total: 12.29 sq mi (31.82 km^{2})
  - Land: 12.26 sq mi (31.76 km^{2})
  - Water: 0.023 sq mi (0.06 km^{2})
- Elevation: 1,263 ft (385 m)

Population (2020)
  - Total: 9,833
  - Density: 801.9/sq mi (309.6/km^{2})
- Time zone: UTC-6 (Central (CST))
  - Summer (DST): UTC-5 (CDT)
- ZIP code: 78015
- Area code: 830
- FIPS code: 48-25168
- GNIS feature ID: 2410473
- Website: www.fairoaksranch.gov

Fair Oaks Ranch is a city in Bexar, Comal, and Kendall counties in the U.S. state of Texas. The city was name for Ralph E. Fair Sr, a successful oilman and rancher who used to operate a ranch that became the town. The population was 9,833 at the 2020 census, and an estimated 10,505 in 2021. It is part of the San Antonio-New Braunfels Metropolitan Statistical Area.

== History ==
The land on which Fair Oaks Ranch rests was acquired in the 1930s by Ralph Fair Sr., who worked in the oil industry and owned cattle and racehorses. A residential community was established by Fair's family in the 1970s and the community was incorporated in 1988.

== Geography ==
Fair Oaks Ranch is located on both sides of Cibolo Creek, 27 miles (43 km) northwest of downtown San Antonio and 8 miles (13 km) southeast of Boerne. The city limits extend southwest to touch Interstate 10 at Exit 546.

According to the United States Census Bureau, the city has a total area of 8.5 square miles (22.1 km^{2}), of which 0.023 square miles (0.06 km^{2}), or 0.26%, is water.

== Demographics ==
Historical population
| Census | Pop. | Note | %± |
|---|---|---|---|
| 1990 | 1,860 | | — |
| 2000 | 4,695 | | 152.4% |
| 2010 | 5,986 | | 27.5% |
| 2020 | 9,833 | | 64.3% |
| 2021 (est.) | 10,505 | | 6.8% |
U.S. Decennial Census

=== 2020 census ===
As of the 2020 census, there were 9,833 people, 3,462 households, and 2,969 families residing in the city. The median age was 47.6 years, with 23.4% of residents under the age of 18 and 23.5% aged 65 or older. For every 100 females there were 97.2 males, and for every 100 females age 18 and over there were 94.9 males age 18 and over.

78.1% of residents lived in urban areas, while 21.9% lived in rural areas.

There were 3,462 households in Fair Oaks Ranch, of which 36.4% had children under the age of 18 living in them. Of all households, 79.8% were married-couple households, 6.1% were households with a male householder and no spouse or partner present, and 11.9% were households with a female householder and no spouse or partner present. About 10.8% of all households were made up of individuals and 6.9% had someone living alone who was 65 years of age or older.

There were 3,581 housing units, of which 3.3% were vacant. The homeowner vacancy rate was 1.6% and the rental vacancy rate was 7.7%.

Racial composition as of the 2020 census
| Race | Number | Percent |
|---|---|---|
| White | 7,883 | 80.2% |
| Black or African American | 164 | 1.7% |
| American Indian and Alaska Native | 39 | 0.4% |
| Asian | 161 | 1.6% |
| Native Hawaiian and Other Pacific Islander | 5 | 0.1% |
| Some other race | 233 | 2.4% |
| Two or more races | 1,348 | 13.7% |
| Hispanic or Latino (of any race) | 1,705 | 17.3% |

=== 2000 census ===
As of the census of 2000, there were 4,695 people, 1,683 households, and 1,531 families residing in the city. The population density was 656.4 inhabitants per square mile (253.4/km^{2}). There were 1,731 housing units at an average density of 242.0 units per square mile (93.4 units/km^{2}). The racial makeup of the city was 96.38% White, 0.38% African American, 0.43% Native American, 0.62% Asian, 0.06% Pacific Islander, 1.04% from other races, and 1.09% from two or more races. Hispanic or Latino of any race were 7.90% of the population.

There were 1,683 households, out of which 34.8% had children under the age of 18 living with them, 86.4% were married couples living together, 3.7% had a female householder with no husband present, and 9.0% were non-families. 7.4% of all households were made up of individuals, and 3.5% had someone living alone who was 65 years of age or older. The average household size was 2.79 and the average family size was 2.93.

In the city, the population was spread out, with 25.1% under the age of 18, 3.8% from 18 to 24, 19.3% from 25 to 44, 38.0% from 45 to 64, and 13.7% who were 65 years of age or older. The median age was 46 years. For every 100 females, there were 101.2 males. For every 100 females age 18 and over, there were 96.9 males.

The median income for a household in the city was $99,685, and the median income for a family was $101,751. Males had a median income of $72,031 versus $43,750 for females. The per capita income for the city was $45,293. About 1.5% of families and 1.7% of the population were below the poverty line, including 1.3% of those under age 18 and 4.4% of those age 65 or over.

== Education ==
Most of the city of Fair Oaks Ranch is served by the Boerne Independent School District. The public schools that serve the BISD parts of Fair Oaks Ranch are Fair Oaks Ranch ES (K–5), Van Raub ES (K–5), Boerne Middle School South (6–8), Captain Mark Tyler Voss Middle School (6–8), and Boerne Champion High School (9–12).

A portion of Fair Oaks Ranch in Comal County is in the Comal Independent School District. The Comal County portion is zoned to Rahe Bulverde Elementary School, Spring Branch Middle School, and Smithson Valley High School.
