= Van Alstyne, Texas =

- City
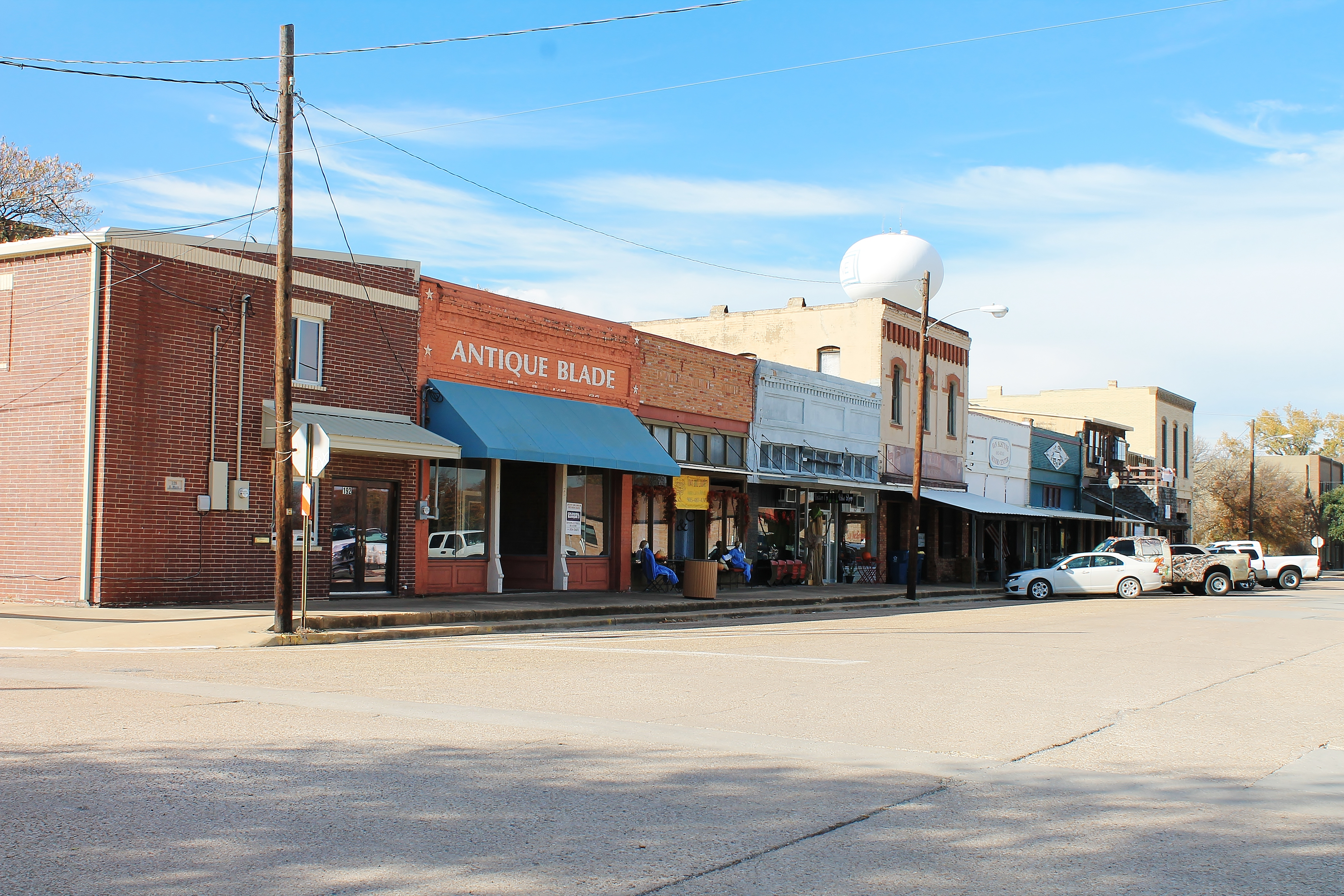
- Motto: "Proud Past, Bright Future"
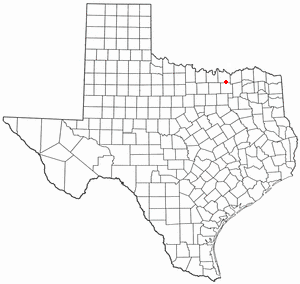
- Location of Van Alstyne, Texas

- Coordinates: 33°25′17″N 96°35′00″W
- Country: United States
- State: Texas
- Counties: Grayson, Collin

Government
  - Type: Council-manager
  - Mayor: Jim Atchison
  - City Manager: Lane Jones

Area
  - City: 5.33 sq mi (13.81 km^{2})
  - Land: 5.33 sq mi (13.81 km^{2})
  - Water: 0 sq mi (0.00 km^{2})
  - Metro: 979 sq mi (2,536 km^{2})
- Elevation: 781 ft (238 m)

Population (2020)
  - City: 4,369
  - Estimate (2023): 8,500
  - Density: 819.4/sq mi (316.4/km^{2})
  - Metro: 120,877
  - Metro density: 130/sq mi (50/km^{2})
- Time zone: UTC-6 (Central (CST))
  - Summer (DST): UTC-5 (CDT)
- ZIP code: 75495
- Area codes: 903, 430
- FIPS code: 48-74924
- GNIS feature ID: 2412145
- Website: www.cityofvanalstyne.us

Van Alstyne is a small, affluent, and rapidly growing city in Grayson and Collin Counties in the U.S. state of Texas. The population was 3,046 at the 2010 census, up from 2,502 at the 2000 census. As of the 2020 United States census, the population grew to 4,369 people. 2023 estimates place the resident count at 5,378. The city’s population in 2026 is now 8,598. The Grayson County portion of Van Alstyne is part of the Sherman–Denison Metropolitan Statistical Area which is also part of the Dallas-Fort Worth, TX-OK combined statistical area

== History ==
Drawn by the economic promise of the Houston and Texas Central Railway, Van Alstyne was founded in 1873 by settlers from the nearby community of Mantua. The community was named for Marie Van Alstyne, a Houston socialite and major shareholder in the railroad company.

A post office was opened that same year, and by the time Van Alstyne officially incorporated in 1890, the town had grown to a population of 400, supported by a thriving rural economy, a local newspaper, and a college. By the turn of the century, the population had reached 1,940, and the town supported a range of businesses, including multiple banks, a grain elevator, a roller mill, and a chemical company.

Throughout the 20th century, Van Alstyne remained a vibrant rural hub for agriculture, trade, manufacturing, and banking. Its economy, along with strong community institutions, sustained the town through decades of slow, steady development and moderate population growth.

In May 2022, citizens passed a resolution establishing the first city charter, making Van Alstyne a Texas home rule city. Van Alstyne is a council/manager form of government with a mayor and 6 city council members each elected at large by place to three year terms.

== Geography ==
Van Alstyne is located in southeastern Grayson County. The city limits extend south slightly into Collin County.

The U.S. Route 75 freeway runs through the western side of the city, with access from Exits 50 and 51. US 75 leads north 27 miles (43 km) to Denison and south 50 miles (80 km) to the center of Dallas. Van Alstyne's immediate neighbors are Anna to the south and Howe to the north.

According to the United States Census, Van Alstyne has a total area of 4.1 square miles (10.5 km^{2}), all land.

== Demographics ==
Historical population
Census	Pop.	Note	%±
1870	213		—
1880	737		246.0%
1890	737		0.0%
1900	1,940		163.2%
1910	1,441		−25.7%
1920	1,588		10.2%
1930	1,453		−8.5%
1940	1,650		13.6%
1950	1,649		−0.1%
1960	1,608		−2.5%
1970	1,981		23.2%
1980	1,860		−6.1%
1990	2,090		12.4%
2000	2,502		19.7%
2010	3,046		21.7%
2020	4,369		43.4%
2023 (est.)	6,782		55.2%
U.S. Decennial Census

=== 2020 census ===
As of the 2020 census, Van Alstyne had a population of 4,369, a median age of 36.3 years, and 29.0% of residents under the age of 18 while 15.9% were 65 years of age or older. For every 100 females there were 92.5 males, and for every 100 females age 18 and over there were 87.5 males age 18 and over. The city was home to 1,108 families.

95.0% of residents lived in urban areas, while 5.0% lived in rural areas.

There were 1,605 households in Van Alstyne, of which 40.8% had children under the age of 18 living in them. Of all households, 54.9% were married-couple households, 13.4% were households with a male householder and no spouse or partner present, and 27.5% were households with a female householder and no spouse or partner present. About 25.0% of all households were made up of individuals and 14.2% had someone living alone who was 65 years of age or older.

There were 1,726 housing units, of which 7.0% were vacant. The homeowner vacancy rate was 1.3% and the rental vacancy rate was 6.7%.

Racial composition as of the 2020 census
Race	Number	Percent
White	3,447	78.9%
Black or African American	156	3.6%
American Indian and Alaska Native	45	1.0%
Asian	37	0.8%
Native Hawaiian and Other Pacific Islander	0	0.0%
Some other race	242	5.5%
Two or more races	442	10.1%
Hispanic or Latino (of any race)	710	16.3%

== Education ==
=== Public schools ===
Students are served by the Van Alstyne Independent School District. Schools in the district include Partin Elementary School (formerly Van Alstyne Elementary School), Sanford Elementary School, Williams Elementary School, Van Alstyne Middle School, Van Alstyne Junior High School and Van Alstyne High School.

=== Colleges ===
Grayson County College operates a branch campus in Van Alstyne.

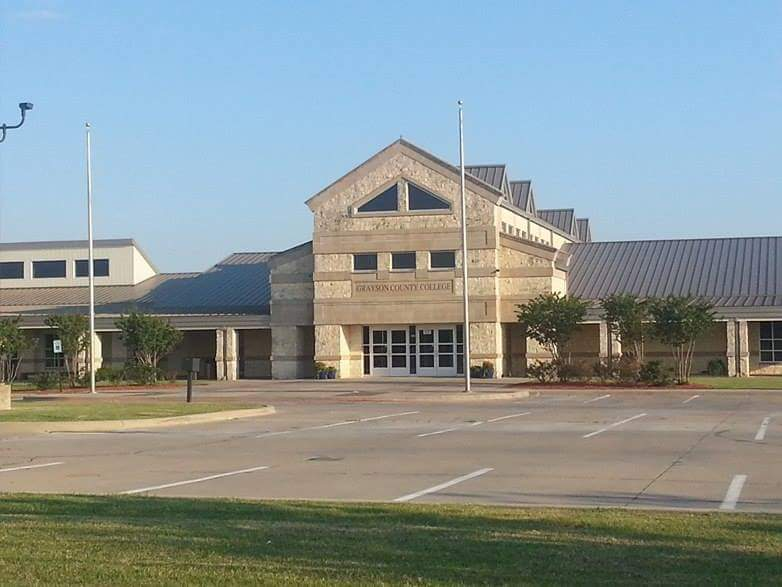
Grayson College's south campus in Van Alstyne

== Transportation ==
US Highway 75 and Texas State Highway 5 runs north-south through Van Alstyne with 75 being on the western edge while SH 5 runs straight through Van Alstyne. FM 121 runs east-west through Van Alstyne.

=== Roads ===
- US 75 Runs north-south, goes through Howe in the north and Anna in the south.
- SH 5 Runs north-south, goes through Howe in the north and Anna in the south.
- FM 121 Runs east-west. To the west is Gunter and to the east is Pilot Grove.
