= Twin Sisters, Texas =

Twin Sisters
- Unincorporated community
- Location within the state of Texas Twin Sisters (the United States)
- Coordinates: 30°00′10″N 98°24′19″W
- Country: United States
- State: Texas
- County: Blanco
- Elevation: 1,276 ft (389 m)
- Time zone: UTC-6 (Central (CST))
  - Summer (DST): UTC-5 (CDT)
- GNIS feature ID: 1379186

Twin Sisters is an unincorporated community in western Blanco County, Texas, United States. According to the Handbook of Texas, the community had a population of 78 in 2000.

== History ==
The community was named for two nearby hills that form a visible landmark. The area in what is known as Twin Sisters today was first settled by Joel Cherry, who moved to the area from Tennessee and settled on the Little Blanco Creek in 1854. More English and German settlers arrived soon after and became a prominent German settlement in the county by the late-1850s. A post office was established at Twin Sisters in 1856 and remained in operation until 1951 when it received its mail from Blanco. It became the first post office established in the county. It was suspended during the Civil War but resumed when the population continued to grow. The community had three general stores, a gristmill, and a cotton gin in 1890, with one of the stores being owned by Max Krueger, who moved to the area in 1875 and served as the first postmaster and justice of the peace. A dance hall and bowling alley were built in the community soon after and imported beer from St. Louis. He then opened a small brewery nearby, but it closed when he couldn't afford transportation and lacked cooling facilities. He closed the dance hall when it was plagued with shootouts and drunken brawls. A two-year drought caused farmers, ranchers, and even Krueger himself to leave the area. His oldest son, Willy, then returned to the area and bought back the post office and general store and operated them until the 1940s. The current economy centers around ranching and farming. The estimated population of Twin Sisters from 1970 through 2000 was seventy-eight.

== Geography ==
Twin Sisters is located on the Little Blanco River and U.S. Highway 281, 7 mi (11 km) south of Blanco in southernmost Blanco County. It is also located 21 mi (34 km) south of Johnson City, 40 mi (64 km) southeast of Fredericksburg, 34 mi (55 km) west of San Marcos, and 40 mi (64 km) north of San Antonio.

=== Climate ===
The climate in this area is characterized by hot, humid summers and generally mild to cool winters. According to the Köppen Climate Classification system, Twin Sisters has a humid subtropical climate, abbreviated "Cfa" on climate maps.

== Education ==
Twin Sisters is served by the Blanco Independent School District.
