= Bergheim, Texas =

- Unincorporated community
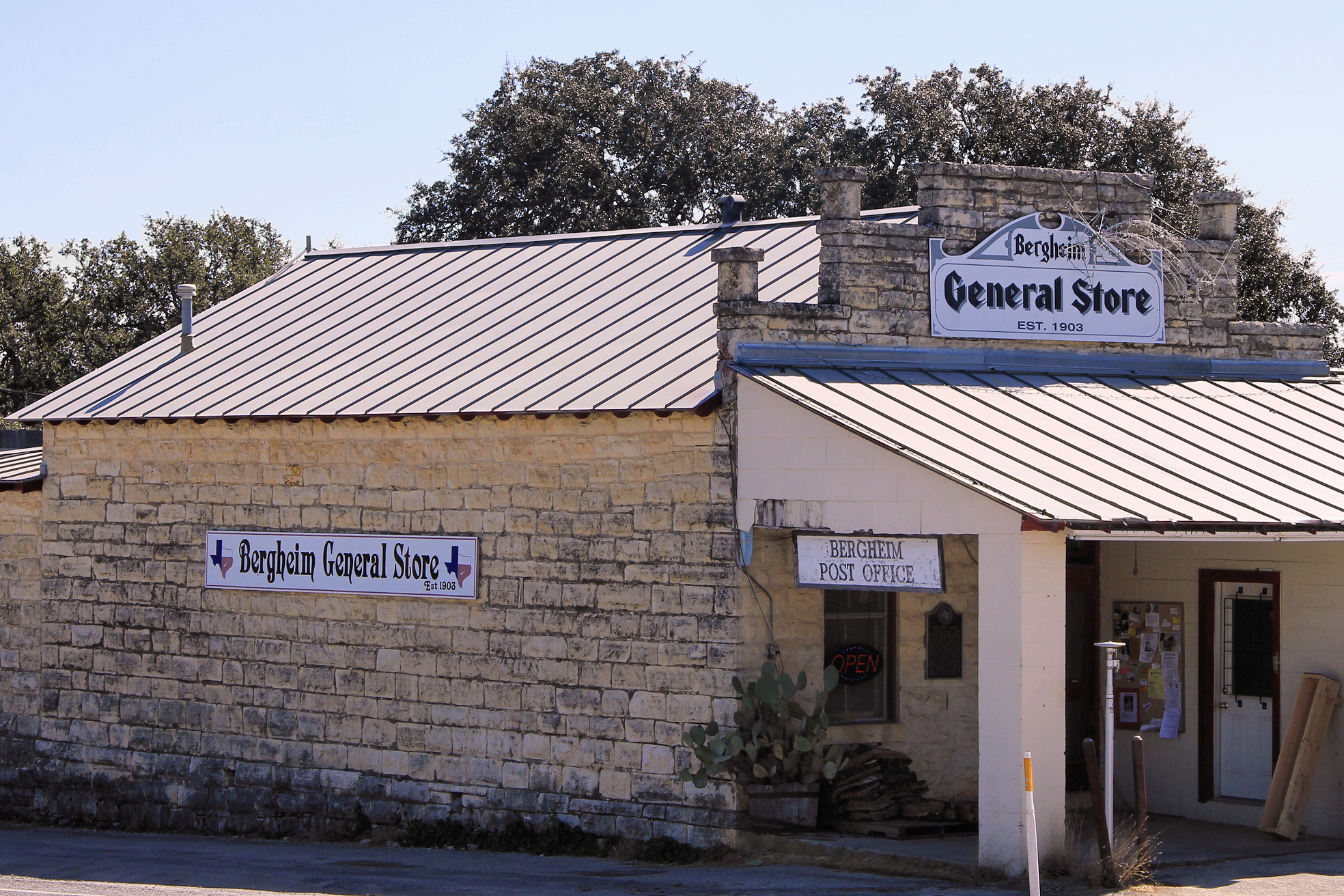
- Bergheim General Store and Post Office

- Location Texas and the United States Bergheim (the United States)
- Coordinates: 29°49′39″N 98°34′31″W
- Country: United States
- State: Texas
- County: Kendall
- Elevation: 1,437 ft (438 m)
- Time zone: UTC-6 (Central (CST))
  - Summer (DST): UTC-5 (CDT)
- ZIP codes: 78004
- GNIS feature ID: 1379408

Bergheim is an unincorporated community in eastern Kendall County, Texas, United States known for its German-Texan culture and heritage. It lies along State Highway 46 east of the city of Boerne, the county seat of Kendall County. Its elevation is 1,437 feet (438 m). Although Bergheim is unincorporated, it has a post office, with the ZIP code of 78004; the ZCTA for ZIP Code 78004, consisting mostly of rural land, had a population of 1,183 at the 2010 census. The community is part of the San Antonio metropolitan statistical area. Bergheim is still a predominantly a ranching and agricultural community.

Bergheim, meaning "Mountain Home" in German, was founded by Austrian immigrant Andreas Engel, who moved to the area and established a store before 1900. The community's post office was established in 1901. Ranching has long been the mainstay of Bergheim's economy, although the harvesting of cedar (juniper) lumber has been important at certain times in its history.

== Major highways ==
- State Highway 46
- Farm to Market Road 3351

== Education ==
The community is served by the Boerne Independent School District.

== Historical Population ==
Historical population
| Census | Pop. | Note | %± |
|---|---|---|---|
| 1920 | 34 | | — |
| 1970 | 22 | | — |
| 1980 | 42 | | 90.9% |
| 1990 | 86 | | 104.8% |
| 2000 | 676 | | 686.0% |
| 2010 | 1,183 | | 75.0% |
