= Boerne Independent School District =

School district in Texas, United States

Location
- Boerne, Texas ESC Region 20 USA
- Coordinates: 29°47′43″N 98°44′10″W

District information
- Type: Independent school district
- Grades: Pre-K through 12
- Established: February 28, 1907
- Superintendent: Dr. Thomas Price
- Schools: 14 (2022-2023)
- NCES District ID: 4810710

Students and staff
- Students: 8,732 (2017-18)
- Teachers: 470 (2014-15) (on full-time equivalent (FTE) basis)
- Student–teacher ratio: 15.9 (2014-15)

Other information
- TEA District Accountability Rating for 2014-15: Met Standard
- Website: Boerne ISD

Boerne Independent School District is a public school district based in Boerne, Texas (USA). Located in Kendall County, portions of the district extend into Bexar and Comal counties. In addition to Boerne, the communities of Fair Oaks Ranch and Scenic Oaks also lie within the district.

== Academic Achievement ==
In the 2021-2022 school year, Boerne ISD received a rating of 'A' from the Texas Education Agency on its A-F scale. The district also received ‘A’ ratings in the 2017-2018 and 2018-19 school years; the TEA did not rate school districts in the 2019-2020 or 2020-21 school year due to the pandemic. Only 1% of schools received an 'A' during all three grading periods.

== Schools ==
In the 2022-2023 school year, the district had students in 14 schools.

High Schools (Grades 9-12)

- Boerne High School
- Samuel V. Champion High School

Middle Schools (Grades 6-8)

- Boerne Middle School North
- Boerne Middle School South
- Capt. Mark Tyler Voss Middle School

Elementary Schools (Grades K-5)

- Cibolo Creek Elementary
- Curington Elementary
- Fabra Elementary
- Fair Oaks Ranch Elementary
- Kendall Elementary
- Van Raub Elementary
- Viola Wilson Elementary
- Dr. Ferdinand L. Herff Elementary School

Other

- Boerne Academy (Grade 9-12)
- Boerne Alternative School (Grades K-12)

Closed

- Boerne Elementary School
- Fabra Elementary
- Boerne Junior High School
- Old Boerne High School
- Boerne School For Colors

== Departments ==
- Athletics Department
- Business Office
- Communications Office
- Curriculum & Instruction
- Custodial Department
- Facilities and Construction Department
- Food Services
- Health Services
- Human Resources
- Maintenance Department
- Special Education
- Technology Services
- Transportation Department
- Warehouse

== Awards and honors ==
In 2014, both Boerne High School and Boerne Champion High School were among 500 schools in the nation listed on Newsweek's Top High Schools in America.

In 2020, HEB's Excellence in Education Awards named BISD as the Best Small School District in Texas.

In 2022, the International Center for Leadership in Education named the district one of eight Innovative Districts in the United States.

As of 2022 US News had BISD's high schools, Champion HS and Boerne HS, ranked #141 and #211 in Texas respectively.

== See also ==
- List of school districts in Texas
- List of high schools in Texas
