= Willie Upshaw =

American baseball player (born 1957)

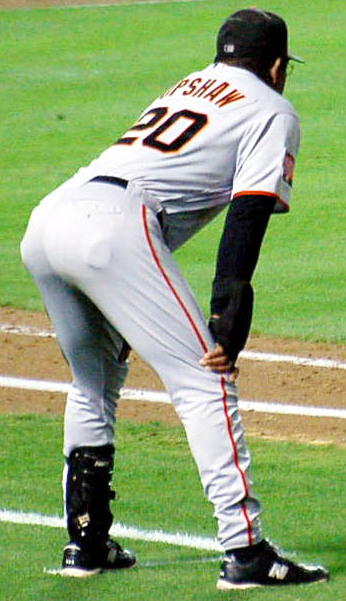
- Upshaw with the San Francisco Giants
- First baseman
- Born: April 27, 1957 (age 69); Blanco, Texas, U.S.
- Batted: Left Threw: Left

Professional debut
- MLB: April 9, 1978, for the Toronto Blue Jays
- NPB: April 8, 1989, for the Fukuoka Daiei Hawks

Last appearance
- MLB: September 28, 1988, for the Cleveland Indians
- NPB: June 29, 1990, for the Fukuoka Daiei Hawks

MLB statistics
- Batting average: .262
- Home runs: 123
- Runs batted in: 528

NPB statistics
- Batting average: .245
- Home runs: 39
- Runs batted in: 97
- Stats at Baseball Reference

Teams
- As player: Toronto Blue Jays (1978–1987); Cleveland Indians (1988); Fukuoka Daiei Hawks (1989–1990); As coach: Texas Rangers (1993–1994); Toronto Blue Jays (1996–1997); San Francisco Giants (2005–2007)

Willie Clay Upshaw (born April 27, 1957) is an American former Major League Baseball player who played first base for the Toronto Blue Jays (1978, 1980–1987) and Cleveland Indians (1988), both of the American League.

Following his Major League career, he played two seasons in Japan for the Fukuoka Daiei Hawks (1989–1990).

Upshaw was later the field manager of the independent minor league Bridgeport Bluefish.

== Playing career ==
Upshaw was drafted by the New York Yankees in the fifth round of the 1975 Major League Baseball draft.

He was selected by the Toronto Blue Jays in the Rule 5 draft on December 5, 1977 Making his major league debut for Toronto in 1978, for the next few seasons Upshaw bounced regularly between the majors and the minors, spending all of 1979 in the minor leagues. He played both outfield and first base, and after being a utility player for much of 1980 and 1981, in 1982 Upshaw became the Blue Jays' regular first baseman. In his first season as a regular, Upshaw lead the team in home runs with 21, RBI with 75, and extra base hits.

In 1983, Upshaw became the first Blue Jays player to reach the 100 RBI plateau in a season, driving in 104 runs while batting .306.

Upshaw remained the teams everyday first baseman through 1987, including their 1985 season as AL East champions. Prior to the 1988 season, Upshaw's contract was purchased by the Cleveland Indians. He was Cleveland's regular first baseman through the end of 1988.

== Post-playing career ==
Upshaw spent eight seasons as manager of the independent Bridgeport Bluefish over two stints (1998-2000, 2010-2014) and also managed the club during the second half of their 2009 season following the resignation of manager Tommy John.

Upshaw was a combined 571-543 (.513) during the regular season, leading the Bluefish to four of their playoff appearances (1998-2000, 2010), three trips to the Atlantic League Championship Series (1998-1999, 2010) and their lone league championship (1999) and was named league Manager of the Year in 1998 and 2010.

During 2006 and 2007, Upshaw served as the first base coach for the San Francisco Giants. When Barry Bonds broke Hank Aaron's career home run record, Upshaw was the first to congratulate him with a high-five as Bonds circled the bases.

== Personal life ==
He is the cousin of National Football League (NFL) Hall of Fame guard Gene Upshaw and former NFL defensive lineman Marvin Upshaw.

Upshaw resides in Fairfield, Connecticut.
