= Samuel V. Champion High School =

Public high school in Boerne, Texas, United States

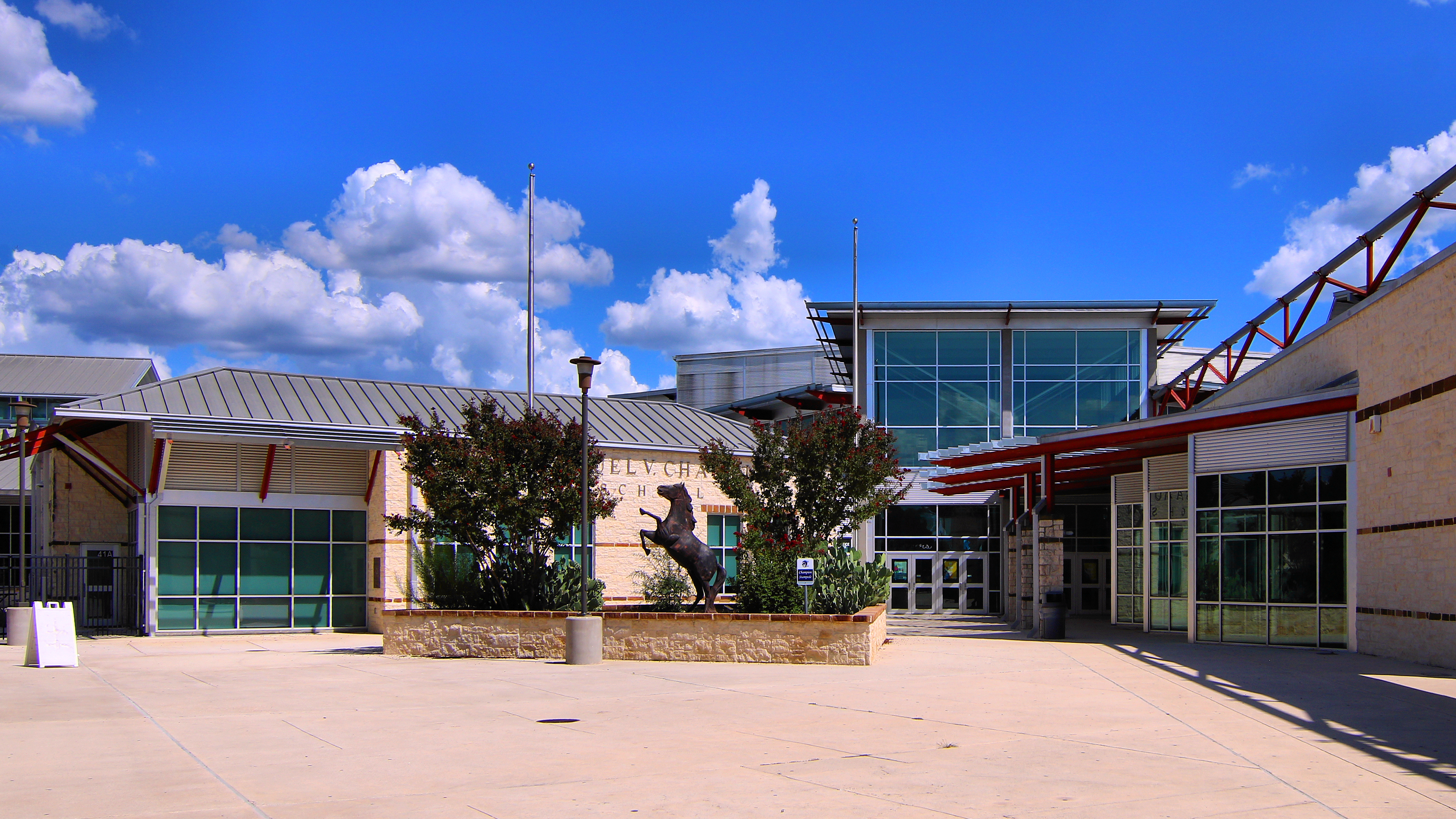

Location
- 201 Charger Blvd; Boerne, Texas 78006; Boerne, Texas; United States; 29.7852°N 98.7044°W

Information
- Type: Public, secondary
- Established: 2008
- School district: Boerne Independent School District
- CEEB code: 440732
- Principal: Natalie Benke
- Teaching staff: 108.33 (FTE)
- Grades: 9-12
- Enrollment: 2,071 (2023-2024)
- Student to teacher ratio: 19.12
- Colors: Navy and Silver
- Mascot: Chargers
- Newspaper: Charger Ink: chargerink.com
- Feeder schools: Boerne Middle School South (BMSS) and Mark T. Voss Middle School (VMS)
- Website: chs.boerneisd.net

Boerne-Samuel V. Champion High School (CHS) is a 5A senior high school in Boerne, Texas. One of two high schools in Boerne, it is a part of the Boerne Independent School District.

The school opened in 2008 after splitting from Boerne High School and has about 2,000 students in 4 grades. It serves students from Boerne Middle School South and Mark T. Voss Middle School.

== History ==
Champion first opened for the 2008-2009 school year. The school is named after Samuel V. Champion (1954 - 2007), who was a longtime Boerne resident and principal of Boerne High School for many years. He also taught and coached at BHS, and was a member of Boerne High School's graduating class of 1972.

In 2017, the school was expanded, adding several new classrooms and adjusting the parking lot.

In 2019, Champion began accepting students from Mark T. Voss Middle School, changing the number of middle schools feeding into it to 2.

In 2020, publication began of the school's newspaper, Charger Ink, and American Sign Language was added to the languages department.

In 2022, a water polo team was added to the athletics program.

As of 2023, plans are underway to build a new wing of the school to accommodate its growing student body. It will house many of Champion's career pathways as well as other subjects.

In 2026, 247Sports ranked Champion sophomore Ryder Flugence as the No. 1 football recruit in the nation for the Class of 2029.

== Electives ==
Electives offered at Champion include:

=== English, Media and Journalism ===
CHS's yearbook, The Charger, is in its 16th year of publication. Its student-run school newspaper, Charger Ink., is in its 4th year and is exclusively online. There are also journalism, photojournalism, A/V, animation, debate, and creative writing classes available.

=== Agriculture ===
Many of Champion's students come from rural areas or upbringings, so the agriculture program is large and hosted in its own building on campus known as "The Ranch." The Ranch houses Principles of Agriculture, Small Animal Management, Equine Science, Practicum in Agriculture, and some of the technical education courses.

=== Career and Technical Education ===
Many classes are career-based, with some allowing students to graduate high school with an associates degree in that field. These career-based classes include: architecture & interior design, business, computer science, culinary arts, education, engineering, human services, and S.T.E.M. Seniors in the courses take a 'practicum' where they intern at a local business or organization in their field during the school day. There is also an entrepreneur incubator program where students plan, develop, and launch a business over the course of a school year, as well as compete for mentorships and sponsorships for their business.

=== Health Science ===
The health science pathway involves the human body and medicine through courses such as Principles of Health Science, Medical Terminology, Anatomy & Physiology, Health Science Theory, and Forensic Science. Seniors in the pathway do a practicum where they intern at a local medical facility of their choosing. There is also a branch of Health Occupation Students of America (HOSA) at Champion.

=== Fine Arts ===
==== Music ====
There are a men's choir, women's choir, combined choir, orchestra, jazz band, and marching band, as well as music theory courses.

==== Theater ====
In 2023, CHS's theater program won the State UIL One-Act Play competition. The performance season includes a summer comedy, fall drama, spring musical, and UIL one-act. There are also student-directed and written shows throughout the school year, and performances often involve the school's band and orchestra for live music and the dance team for ensemble work. Classes are available in theater, technical theater, and production.

==== Dance ====
The dance team, called the Champion Charms, has a junior varsity and a varsity. It is one of the largest dance teams in the area and regularly performs at football games as well as competes and performs throughout the year. There is also a color guard team that performs with the marching band in the fall and competes independently in the spring.

==== Art ====
The art program has art, drawing, painting, and sculpting classes. Art shows are done a couple times a year and student art is regularly displayed throughout the school halls and library .

=== Language ===
The Languages Other Than English (LOTE) department has three languages: Spanish, German, and American Sign Language. The Spanish program offers AP Spanish Language and AP Spanish Literature.

== Sports ==
As of the 2026 - 2027 school year, Champion HS offers 13 sports:

=== Men's ===
- Baseball (Varsity and Junior Varsity teams)
- Basketball (Varsity and Junior Varsity teams)
- Football (Varsity, Junior Varsity and Freshmen teams)
- Soccer (Varsity and Junior Varsity teams)

=== Women's ===
- Basketball (Varsity and Junior Varsity teams)
- Cheer (Varsity and Junior Varsity teams)
- Soccer (Varsity and Junior Varsity teams)
- Softball (Varsity and Junior Varsity teams)
- Volleyball (Varsity and Junior Varsity teams)

=== Combined ===
- Cross Country (Varsity and Junior Varsity teams)
- Golf
- Swim & Dive
- Tennis (Varsity and Junior Varsity teams)
- Track & Field
- Water Polo

== Academics ==
To graduate, a student at CHS must have a health credit, a fine arts credit, a P.E. credit, two years of a language, four years of science, four years of math, four years of social studies, and four years of English.

Champion is a member of the Advanced Placement (AP) program, and offers many courses for college credit through it. There are also dual-credit programs available through Northwest Vista College and Angelo State University.

== Notable alumni ==
- Davis Brin, college football quarterback for the Georgia Southern Eagles
