= Blanco Independent School District =

School district in Texas, United States

Coordinates: 30°06′20″N 98°25′21″W

Location
- Blanco, Texas ESC Region 13 USA

District information
- Type: Independent school district
- Grades: Pre-K through 12
- Superintendent: Clay Rosenbaum
- Schools: 3 (2009-10)
- NCES District ID: 4810320

Students and staff
- Students: 968 (2010-11)
- Teachers: 91.89 (2009-10) (on full-time equivalent (FTE) basis)
- Student–teacher ratio: 10.59 (2009-10)
- Athletic conference: UIL Class 3A Division II
- District mascot: Panthers
- Colors: Royal Blue, Gold

Other information
- TEA District Accountability Rating for 2011-12: Academically Acceptable
- Website: Blanco ISD

Blanco Independent School District is a public school district based in Blanco, Texas (USA). Located in Blanco County, portions of the district extend into Kendall and Hays counties.

== Finances ==
As of the 2010–11 school year, the appraised valuation of property in the district was $654,434,000. The maintenance tax rate was $0.104 and the bond tax rate was $0.011 per $100 of appraised valuation.

== Academic achievement ==
In 2011, the school district was rated "academically acceptable" by the Texas Education Agency. Forty-nine percent of districts in Texas in 2011 received the same rating. No state accountability ratings will be given to districts in 2012. A school district in Texas can receive one of four possible rankings from the Texas Education Agency: Exemplary (the highest possible ranking), Recognized, Academically Acceptable, and Academically Unacceptable (the lowest possible ranking).

Historical TEA accountability ratings

- 2011: Academically Acceptable
- 2010: Recognized
- 2009: Recognized
- 2008: Academically Acceptable
- 2007: Academically Acceptable
- 2006: Academically Acceptable
- 2005: Academically Acceptable
- 2004: Academically Acceptable

== Schools ==
- Blanco High School (Grades 9‍–‍12)

During 2022‍–‍2023, Blanco High School had an enrollment of 355 students and a student to teacher ratio of 12.40. The school received an overall rating of "B" from the Texas Education Agency for the 2021‍–‍2022 school year with a distinction designation for exceptional achievement in "English/Language Arts/Reading," "Mathematics," "Science," and "Postsecondary Readiness."

- Blanco Middle (Grades 6‍–‍8)

During 2022‍–‍2023, Blanco Middle School had an enrollment of 246 students in grades 6‍–‍8 and a student to teacher ratio of 12.57. The school received an overall rating of "B" from the Texas Education Agency for the 2021‍–‍2022 school year with a distinction designation for exceptional achievement in "Top 25%: Comparative Academic Growth." In 2001‍–‍2002, the school was recognized as a National Blue Ribbon School.

- Blanco Elementary (Grades PK‍–‍5)

During 2022‍–‍2023, Blanco Elementary School had an enrollment of 487 students in grades PK‍–‍5 and a student to teacher ratio of 12.93. The school received an overall rating of "C" from the Texas Education Agency for the 2021‍–‍2022 school year.

== Special programs ==
=== Athletics ===
For the 2016 through 2018 school years, Blanco High School will play football in UIL Class 3A Division II.

== See also ==
- List of school districts in Texas
- List of high schools in Texas
