= Blanco, Texas =

City in Texas, US

Blanco
- City
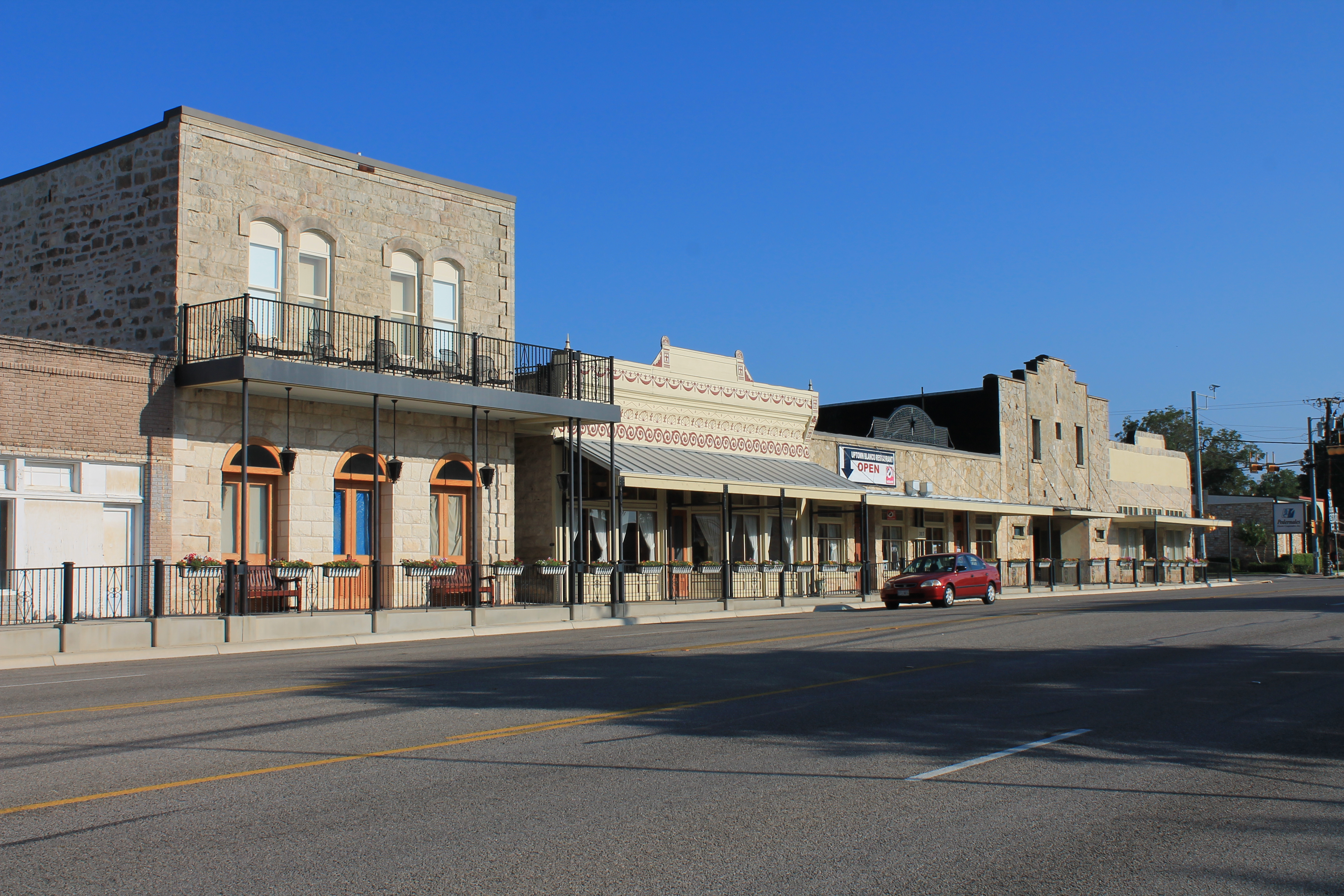
- Blanco Historic District
- Interactive map of Blanco
- Coordinates: 30°05′55″N 98°25′00″W
- Country: United States
- State: Texas
- County: Blanco

Area
  - Total: 3.54 sq mi (9.18 km^{2})
  - Land: 3.49 sq mi (9.03 km^{2})
  - Water: 0.058 sq mi (0.15 km^{2})
- Elevation: 1,306 ft (398 m)

Population (2020)
  - Total: 1,682
  - Density: 482/sq mi (186/km^{2})
- Time zone: UTC-6 (Central (CST))
  - Summer (DST): UTC-5 (CDT)
- ZIP code: 78606
- Area code: 830
- FIPS code: 48-08536
- GNIS feature ID: 2409862
- Website: www.cityofblancotx.gov

Blanco (Spanish: "white", /ˈblæŋkoʊ/ BLANG-koh) is a city in Blanco County, Texas, United States. The population was 1,682 at the 2020 census. Blanco is a cattle and ranching community.

== Demographics ==
Historical population
Census	Pop.	Note	%±
1880	245		—
1940	453		—
1950	718		58.5%
1960	789		9.9%
1970	1,022		29.5%
1980	1,179		15.4%
1990	1,238		5.0%
2000	1,505		21.6%
2010	1,739		15.5%
2020	1,682		−3.3%
U.S. Decennial Census

=== 2020 census ===
As of the 2020 census, Blanco had a population of 1,682. The median age was 45.1 years. 20.4% of residents were under the age of 18 and 21.8% of residents were 65 years of age or older. For every 100 females there were 89.8 males, and for every 100 females age 18 and over there were 87.3 males age 18 and over.

0% of residents lived in urban areas, while 100.0% lived in rural areas.

There were 724 households in Blanco, of which 27.1% had children under the age of 18 living in them. Of all households, 44.1% were married-couple households, 18.2% were households with a male householder and no spouse or partner present, and 33.4% were households with a female householder and no spouse or partner present. About 36.7% of all households were made up of individuals and 17.3% had someone living alone who was 65 years of age or older.

There were 851 housing units, of which 14.9% were vacant. Among occupied housing units, 58.7% were owner-occupied and 41.3% were renter-occupied. The homeowner vacancy rate was 1.4% and the rental vacancy rate was 8.0%.

Racial composition as of the 2020 census
Race	Percent
White	71.9%
Black or African American	1.0%
American Indian and Alaska Native	1.1%
Asian	0.5%
Native Hawaiian and Other Pacific Islander	0%
Some other race	16.6%
Two or more races	8.9%
Hispanic or Latino (of any race)	31.3%

=== 2000 census ===
As of the census of 2000, there were 1,701 people, 576 households, and 370 families residing in the city. The population density was 899.7 inhabitants per square mile (347.4/km^{2}). There were 633 housing units at an average density of 378.4 per square mile (146.1/km^{2}). The racial makeup of the city was 88.77% White, 1.20% African American, 1.33% Native American, 0.40% Asian, 7.31% from other races, and 1.00% from two or more races. Hispanic or Latino of any race were 22.72% of the population. The 2014 Census Estimate showed a population of 1,876.

There were 576 households, out of which 32.3% had children under the age of 18 living with them, 47.6% were married couples living together, 13.2% had a female householder with no husband present, and 35.6% were non-families. 31.9% of all households were made up of individuals, and 16.5% had someone living alone who was 65 years of age or older. The average household size was 2.46 and the average family size was 3.13.

In the city, the population was spread out, with 25.8% under the age of 18, 8.3% from 18 to 24, 23.5% from 25 to 44, 21.3% from 45 to 64, and 21.1% who were 65 years of age or older. The median age was 39 years. For every 100 females, there were 88.4 males. For every 100 females age 18 and over, there were 79.7 males.

The median income for a household in the city was $31,071, and the median income for a family was $40,398. Males had a median income of $27,188 versus $21,845 for females. The per capita income for the city was $14,797. About 9.9% of families and 13.1% of the population were below the poverty line, including 13.6% of those under age 18 and 10.0% of those age 65 or over.

== Geography ==
Blanco is located in the Texas Hill Country on the Blanco River.

According to the United States Census Bureau, the city has a total area of 3.2 square miles (8.4 km^{2}), of which 3.2 square miles (8.3 km^{2}) is land and 0.04 square miles (0.1 km^{2}), or 1.99%, is water.

=== Climate ===
Climate data for Blanco, Texas (1991–2020 normals, extremes 1896-2021)
Month	Jan	Feb	Mar	Apr	May	Jun	Jul	Aug	Sep	Oct	Nov	Dec	Year
Record high °F (°C)	91 (33)	98 (37)	100 (38)	103 (39)	103 (39)	106 (41)	110 (43)	110 (43)	110 (43)	104 (40)	95 (35)	91 (33)	110 (43)
Mean daily maximum °F (°C)	59.7 (15.4)	63.5 (17.5)	70.2 (21.2)	77.4 (25.2)	83.3 (28.5)	89.8 (32.1)	93.0 (33.9)	94.2 (34.6)	88.0 (31.1)	79.0 (26.1)	68.4 (20.2)	61.2 (16.2)	77.3 (25.2)
Daily mean °F (°C)	47.5 (8.6)	51.3 (10.7)	58.2 (14.6)	65.0 (18.3)	72.6 (22.6)	79.1 (26.2)	81.8 (27.7)	82.0 (27.8)	76.0 (24.4)	66.8 (19.3)	56.5 (13.6)	49.3 (9.6)	65.5 (18.6)
Mean daily minimum °F (°C)	35.3 (1.8)	39.0 (3.9)	46.1 (7.8)	52.6 (11.4)	61.8 (16.6)	68.3 (20.2)	70.5 (21.4)	69.8 (21.0)	64.0 (17.8)	54.7 (12.6)	44.6 (7.0)	37.3 (2.9)	53.7 (12.0)
Record low °F (°C)	−6 (−21)	−6 (−21)	14 (−10)	25 (−4)	34 (1)	46 (8)	53 (12)	48 (9)	38 (3)	21 (−6)	13 (−11)	0 (−18)	−6 (−21)
Average precipitation inches (mm)	2.32 (59)	1.93 (49)	2.86 (73)	2.77 (70)	4.95 (126)	3.21 (82)	1.84 (47)	2.12 (54)	3.72 (94)	3.96 (101)	2.90 (74)	2.23 (57)	34.81 (886)
Average snowfall inches (cm)	0.0 (0.0)	0.0 (0.0)	0.0 (0.0)	0.0 (0.0)	0.0 (0.0)	0.0 (0.0)	0.0 (0.0)	0.0 (0.0)	0.0 (0.0)	0.0 (0.0)	0.0 (0.0)	0.1 (0.25)	0.1 (0.25)
Average precipitation days (≥ 0.01 in)	7.0	6.8	8.3	6.7	7.6	5.7	4.4	4.5	6.1	6.0	6.1	6.7	75.9
Average snowy days (≥ 0.1 in)	0.0	0.0	0.0	0.0	0.0	0.0	0.0	0.0	0.0	0.0	0.0	0.1	0.1
Source: NOAA

== Education ==
Blanco is served by the Blanco Independent School District and home to the Blanco High School Panthers.

== Notable people ==
- Shelley Duvall, actress and producer
- Terence T. Henricks, astronaut
- Patrick Higginbotham, judge
- Emery Nix, professional football player
- Willie Upshaw, professional baseball player
- William D. Wittliff, screenwriter, author and photographer
- Natalie Wolchover, science journalist and winner of the 2022 Pulitzer Prize for Explanatory Reporting

== Gallery ==
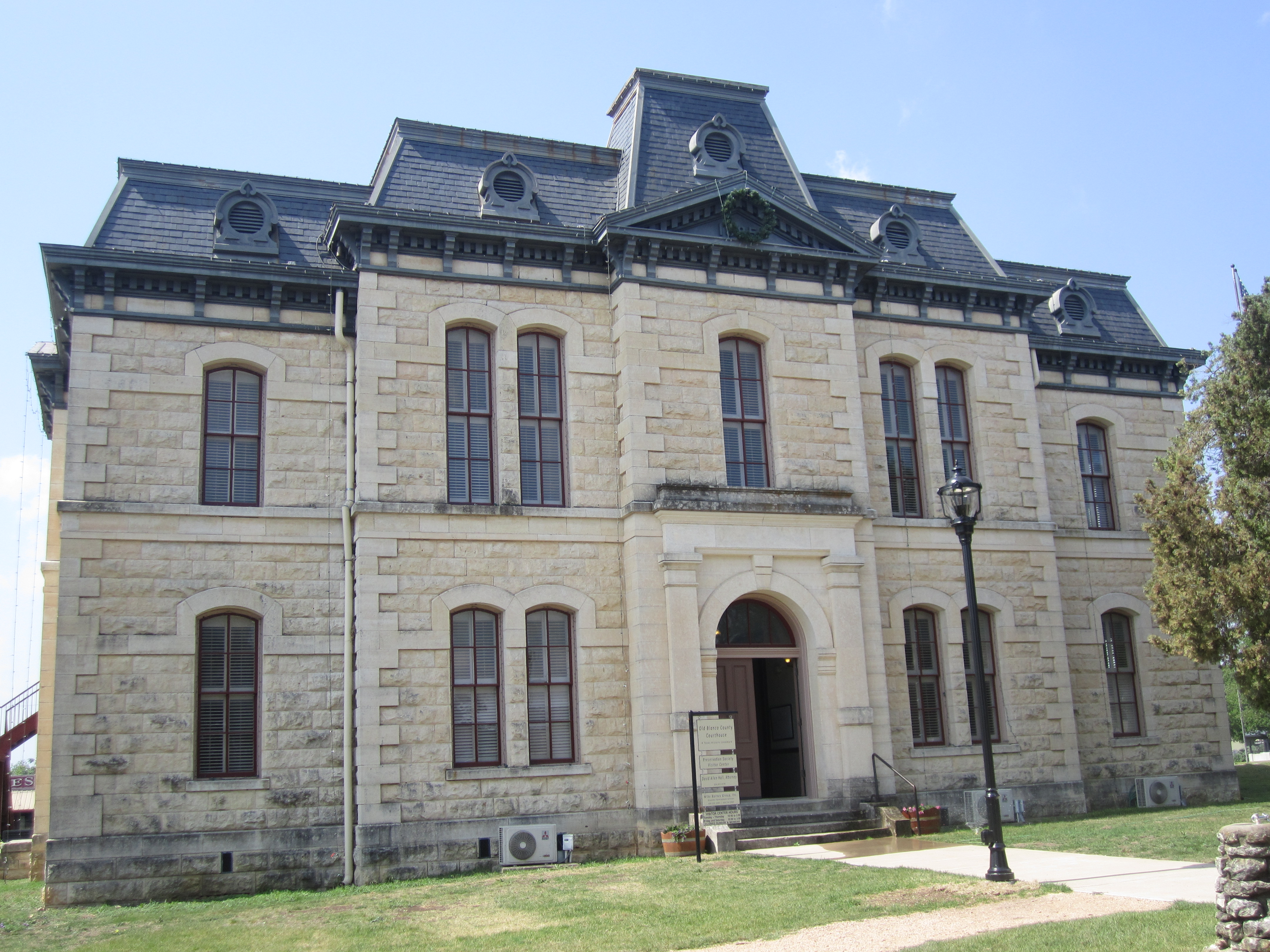
Old Blanco County Courthouse in Blanco is now a visitor center, office building, and event venue.

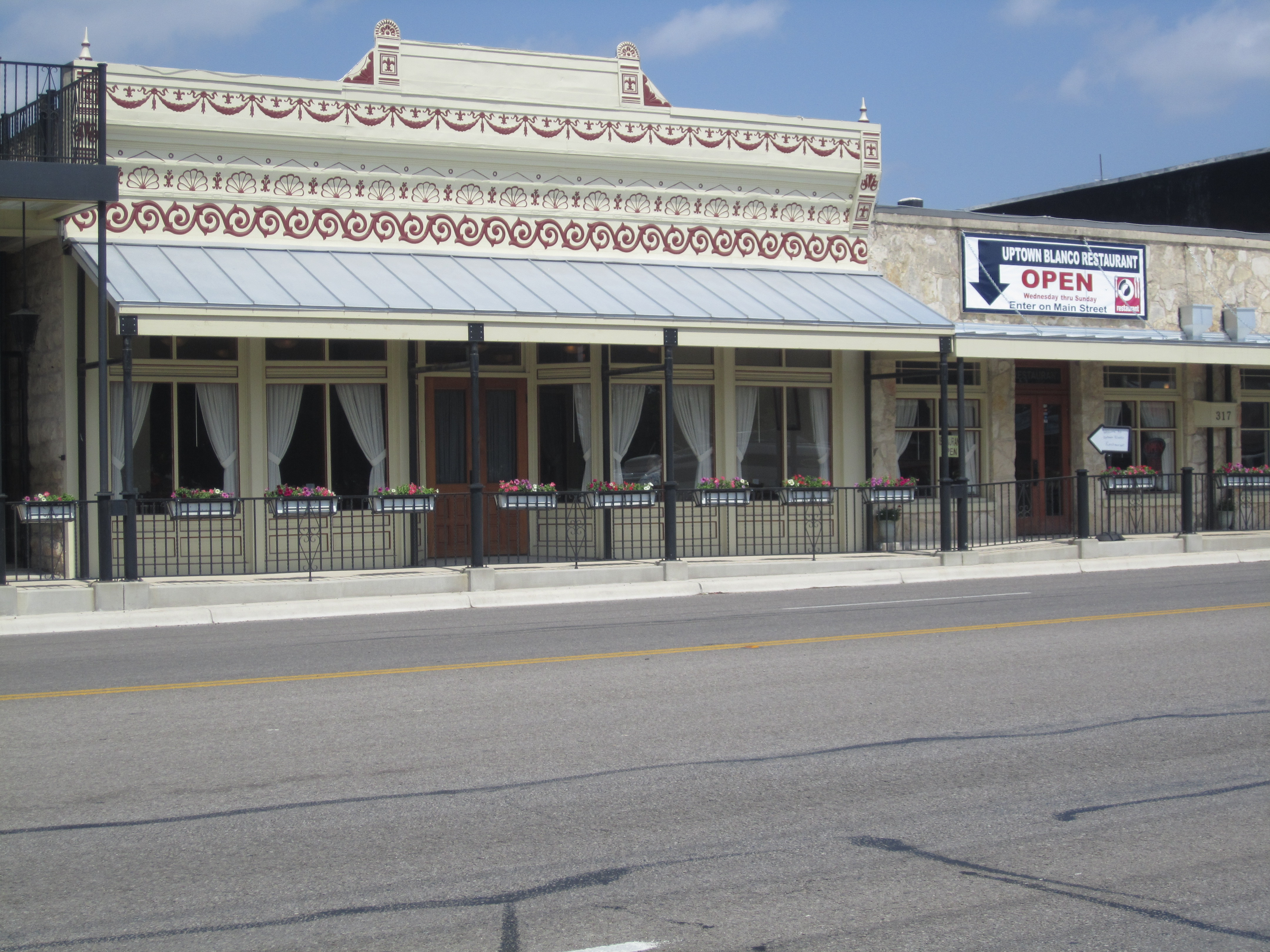
Downtown Blanco along U.S. Route 281

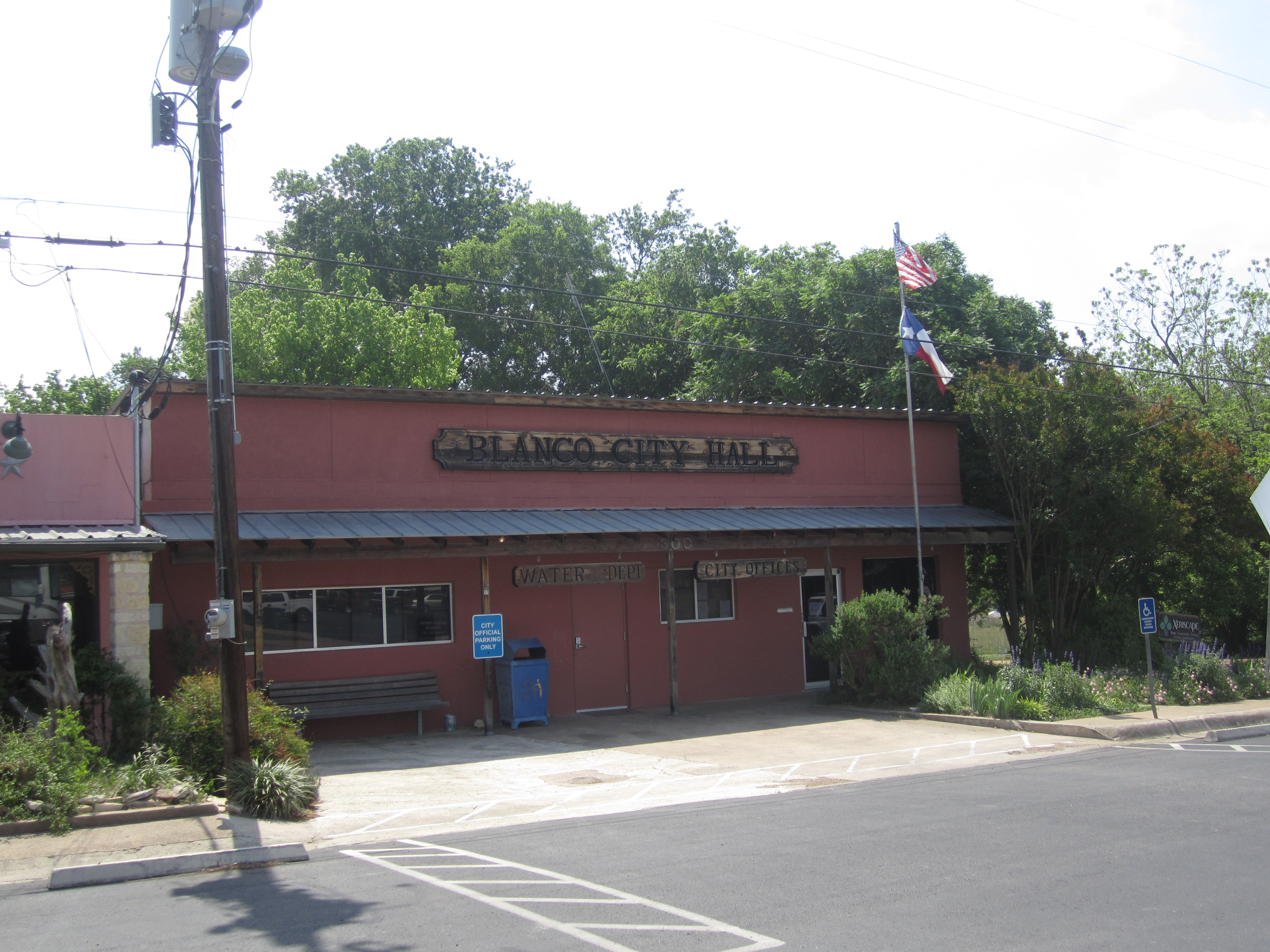
Blanco City Hall is located behind the old courthouse

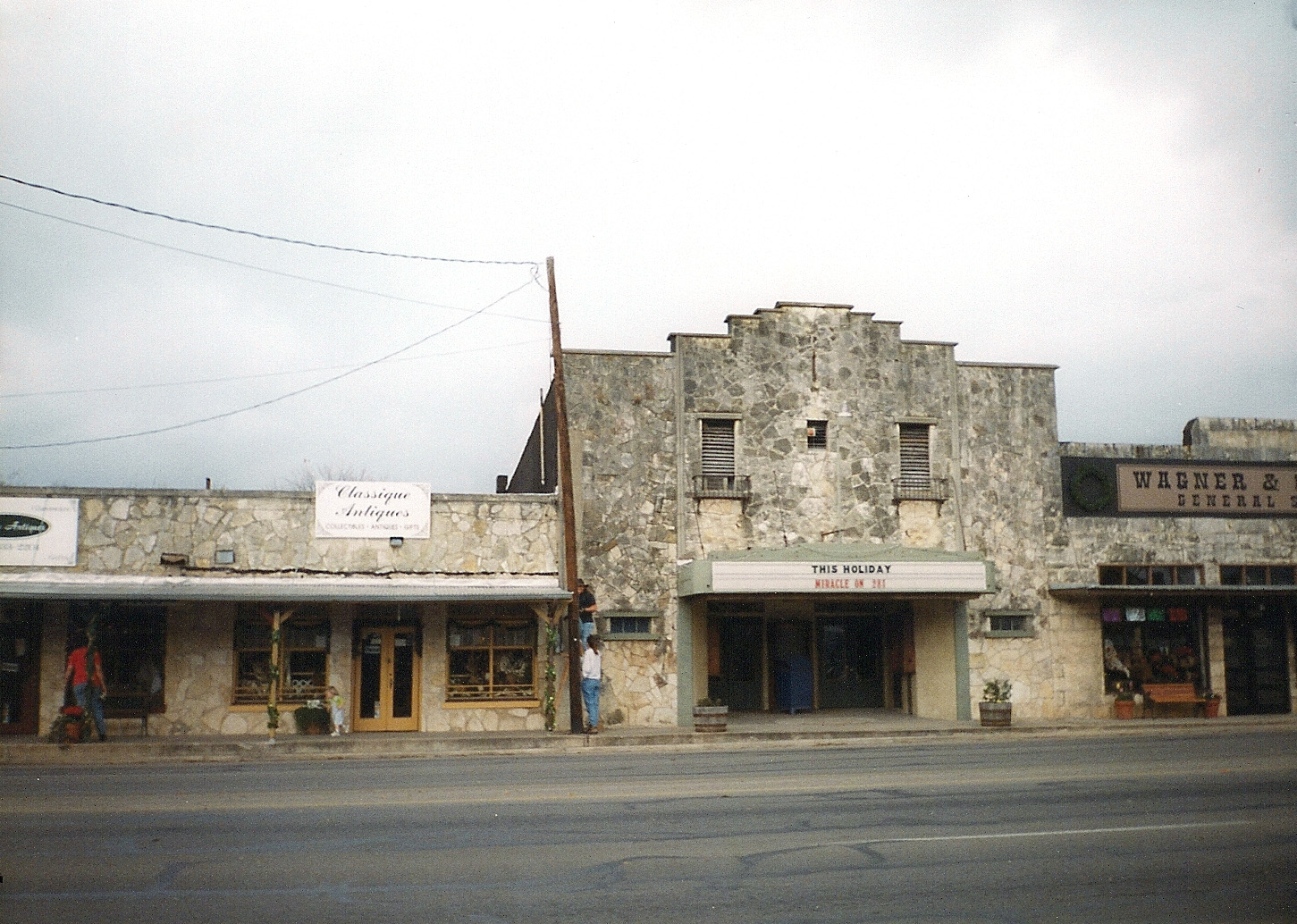
Blanco Theater, on the courthouse square

== See also ==
- List of municipalities in Texas
