= Hye, Texas =

Unincorporated community in Blanco County, Texas, United States

- Unincorporated community
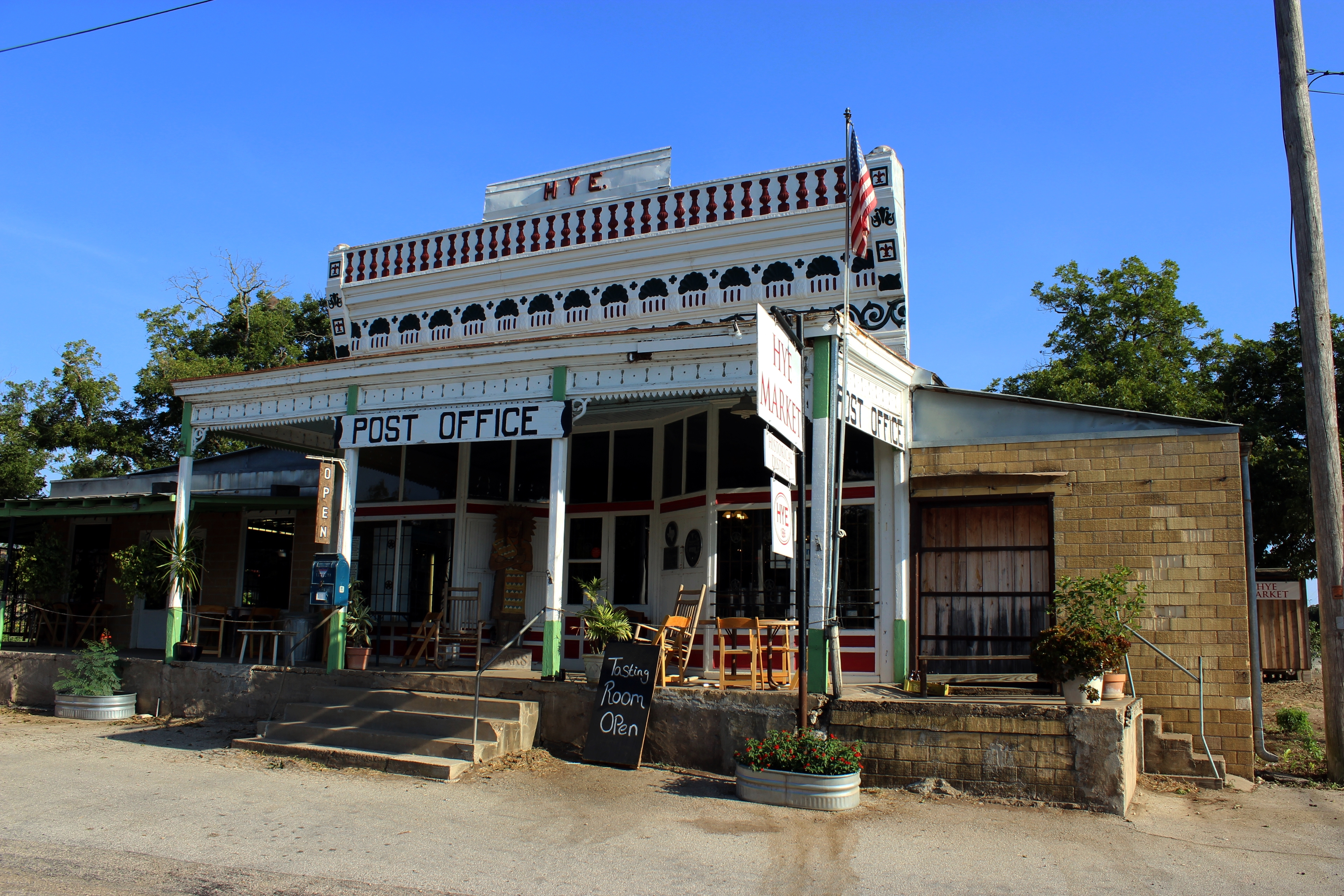
- Hye General Store & Post Office (c. 1886)

- Location within Texas Hye, Texas (the United States)
- Coordinates: 30°14′33″N 98°34′12″W
- Country: United States
- State: Texas
- County: Blanco
- Elevation: 1,453 ft (443 m)
- Time zone: UTC-6 (Central (CST))
  - Summer (DST): UTC-5 (CDT)
- ZIP codes: 78635
- Area code: 830
- FIPS code: 48-35648
- GNIS feature ID: 1378475

Hye is an unincorporated community in western Blanco County, Texas, United States. According to the Handbook of Texas, the community had a population of 105 in 2000.

== History ==
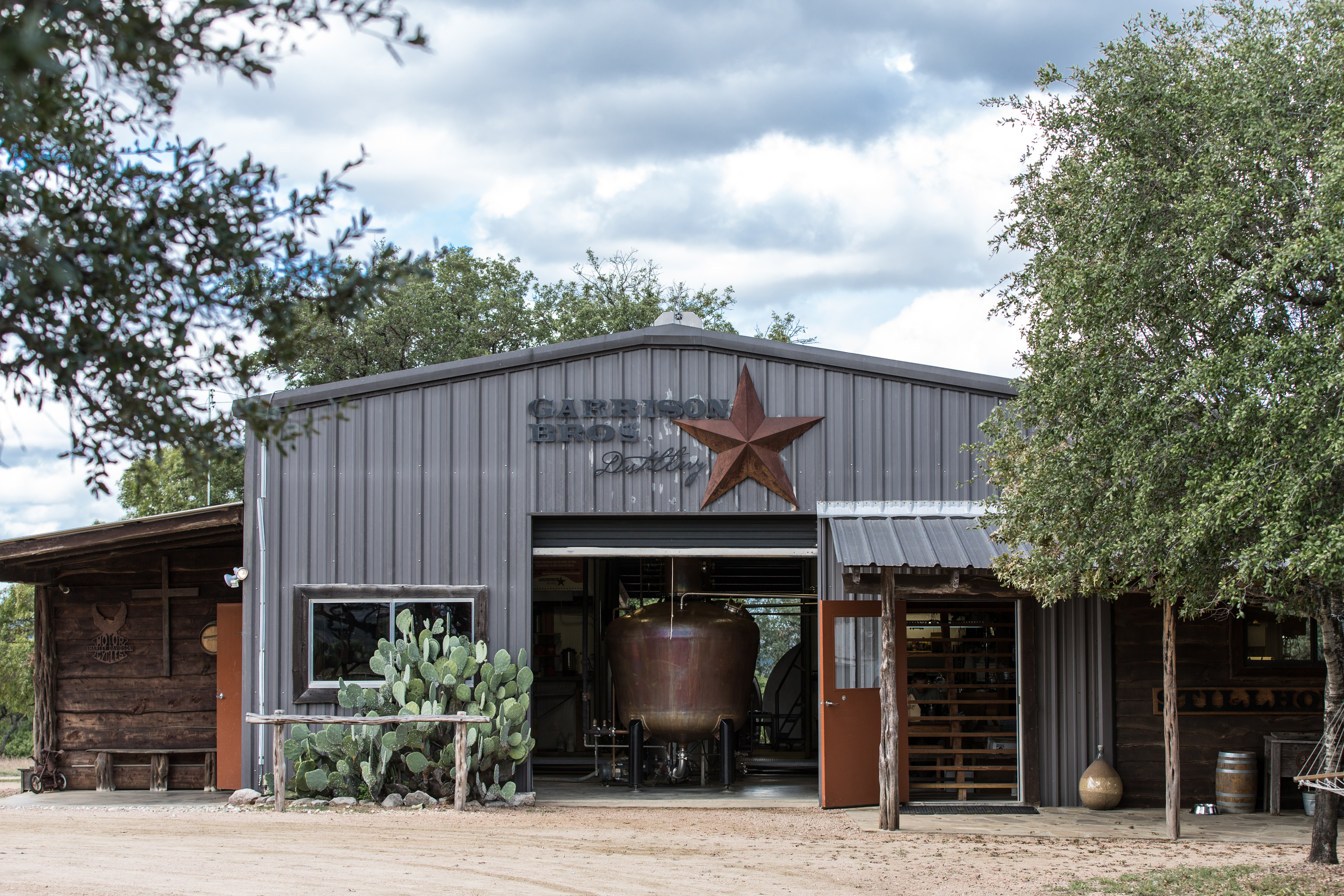
Garrison Brothers Stillhouse in Hye, October 2017

The first settlers came to the area in 1860 when several farmers and ranchers moved to Rocky Creek, located three miles east of the community. It continued to grow when German and Anglo settlers came to the area throughout the 1860s and '70s. Hiram ("Hye") G. Brown and his parents settled in the Rocky Creek area of Blanco County, circa 1872. He constructed a small store and house near the Pedernales River on the Austin-Fredericksburg road. Brown was appointed postmaster upon getting a post office established in his store on April 17, 1886. The post office was named Hye for him. The establishment of the post office drew other businesses to the area, eventually bringing in a grist mill, a blacksmith shop, and a cotton gin. In 1904, Brown erected a new building for the store and post office. In 1965, on the porch of the Hye post office, Lyndon B. Johnson swore in Lawrence F. O'Brien as United States Postmaster General. Johnson's boyhood home is located nearby and is reportedly where he mailed his first letter at the post office when he was just four years old. The community's population was 200 during the 1920s and '30s, dropped to 50 during World War II, grew to 90 in 1947, its zenith of 140 in 1968, and settled at 105 from 1970 through 2000.

In 1966, the Hye General Store and Post Office was designated a Recorded Texas Historic Landmark, marker number 2607.

The Garrison Brothers Distillery also operates in the community.

== Geography ==
Hye lies along U.S. Route 290 near the Gillespie County line, 10 mi (16 km) west of Johnson City, the county seat of Blanco County. It is also located 60 mi (97 km) west of Austin and 20 mi (32 km) east of Fredericksburg.

=== Climate ===
The climate in this area is characterized by hot, humid summers and generally mild to cool winters. According to the Köppen climate classification, Hye has a humid subtropical climate, Cfa on climate maps.

Climate data for Hye, TX (1991-2020)
Month	Jan	Feb	Mar	Apr	May	Jun	Jul	Aug	Sep	Oct	Nov	Dec	Year
Average precipitation inches (mm)	1.89 (48)	1.88 (48)	2.37 (60)	2.36 (60)	4.38 (111)	3.18 (81)	2.07 (53)	2.14 (54)	3.47 (88)	3.15 (80)	2.45 (62)	1.87 (47)	31.21 (792)
Average snowfall inches (cm)	0.0 (0.0)	0.1 (0.25)	0.0 (0.0)	0.0 (0.0)	0.0 (0.0)	0.0 (0.0)	0.0 (0.0)	0.0 (0.0)	0.0 (0.0)	0.0 (0.0)	0.0 (0.0)	0.0 (0.0)	0.1 (0.25)
Average precipitation days (≥ 0.01 in)	4.8	4.7	5.4	4.1	5.9	4.5	3.9	3.5	4.5	4.2	3.8	4.0	53.3
Source: NOAA

== Education ==
Hye is served by the Johnson City Independent School District.

== See also ==
- List of unincorporated communities in Texas
