= Sandy, Blanco County, Texas =

- Unincorporated community
- Location within Texas Location within the United States
- Coordinates: 30°21′39″N 98°28′10″W
- Country: United States
- State: Texas
- County: Blanco
- Elevation: 1,280 ft (390 m)
- Time zone: UTC-6 (Central (CST))
  - Summer (DST): UTC-5 (CDT)
- Area code: 830
- GNIS feature ID: 1379023

Sandy is an unincorporated community in Blanco County, in the U.S. state of Texas. According to the Handbook of Texas, the community had a population of 25 in 2000.

== Geography ==
Sandy is located at the intersection of Farm to Market Roads 1320 and 1323, 7 mi (11 km) northwest of Johnson City in northwestern Blanco County. It is also located 80 mi (130 km) west of Austin and 39 mi (63 km) west of Fredericksburg.

=== Climate ===
The climate in this area is characterized by hot, humid summers, and generally mild to cool winters. According to the Köppen Climate Classification system, Sandy has a humid subtropical climate, abbreviated "Cfa" on climate maps.

== Education ==
Sometime during the 20th century, Sandy joined with the Johnson City Independent School District. It continues to be served by the Johnson City ISD today.
