= Post Oak, Blanco County, Texas =

- Unincorporated community
- Location within Texas Location within the United States
- Coordinates: 30°18′13″N 98°32′31″W
- Country: United States
- State: Texas
- County: Blanco
- Elevation: 1,467 ft (447 m)
- Time zone: UTC-6 (Central (CST))
  - Summer (DST): UTC-5 (CDT)
- Area code: 830
- GNIS feature ID: 2034987

Post Oak is an unincorporated community in Blanco County, in the U.S. state of Texas. According to the Handbook of Texas, the community had a population of 10 in 2000.

== History ==
The area in what is known as Post Oak today was first settled by Pinkney Hickson circa 1874. He donated two acres of land on which to build a cemetery. Fifteen families lived in the community in 1958, with an official population of 10 in 2000.

== Geography ==
Post Oak is located at the intersection of Farm to Market Roads 1320 and 2721 near Post Oak Creek, 8 mi (13 km) northwest of Johnson City in western Blanco County.

== Education ==
Pinkney Hickson donated a half-acre of land for a school to be built on. It joined the Johnson City Independent School District in the late 1930s. The community continues to be served by Johnson City ISD today.
