= Lyndon B. Johnson High School (Johnson City, Texas) =

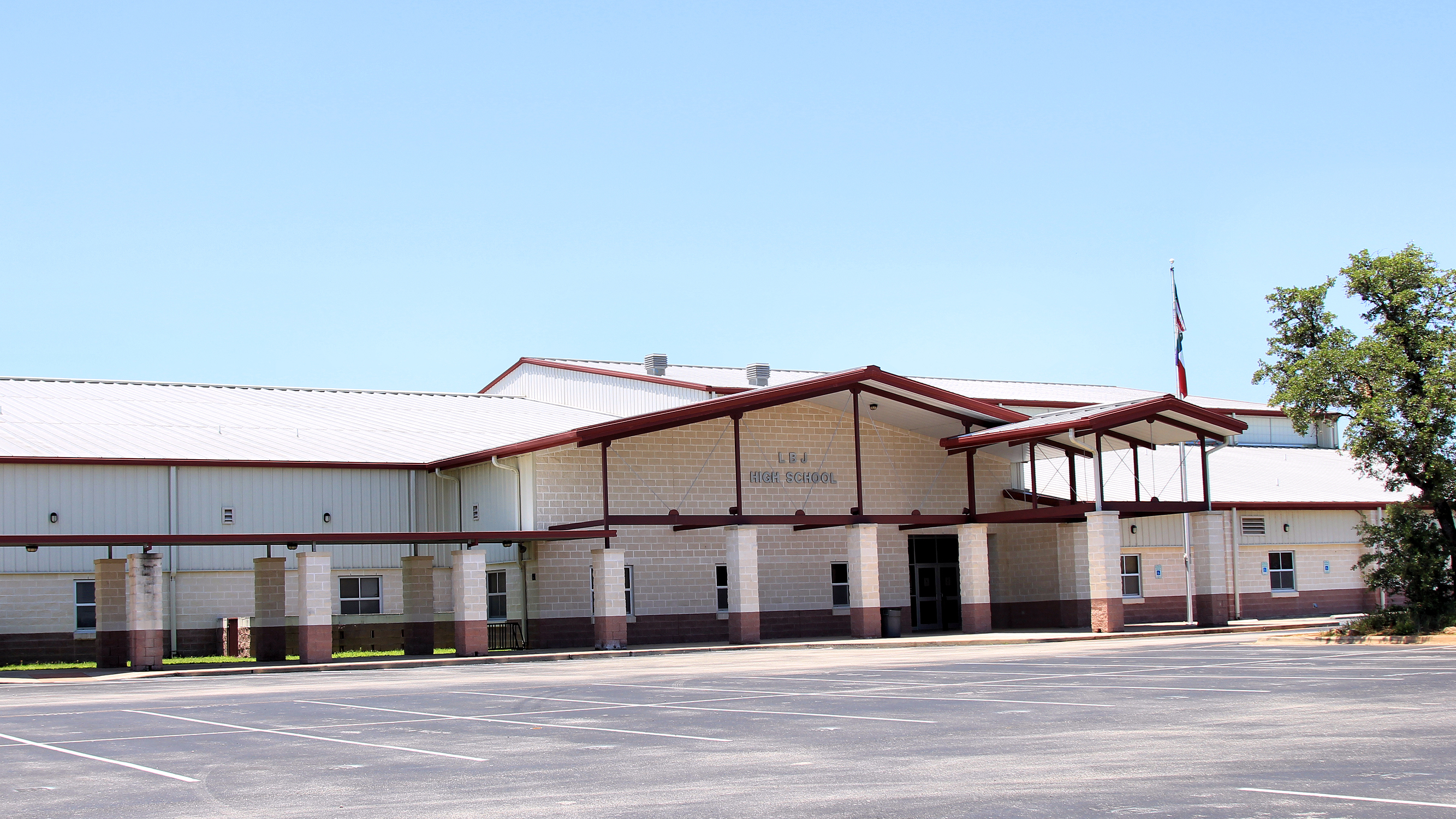
- Entrance to LBJ High School

Location
- 505 North Nugent Avenue; Johnson City, Blanco County, Texas 78636-0498; United States; 30.283705°N 98.414701°W

Information
- School type: Public, high school
- Locale: Rural: Distant
- School district: Johnson City ISD
- NCES School ID: 482484002777
- Principal: Russell Maedgen
- Teaching staff: 23.19 (on an FTE basis)
- Grades: 9‍–‍12
- Enrollment: 225 (2025‍–‍2026)
- Student to teacher ratio: 10.78
- Colors: Maroon & White
- Athletics conference: UIL Class 2A
- Mascot: Eagle
- Website: LBJ High School

Lyndon Baines Johnson High School or LBJ High School is a public high school located in Johnson City, Texas (USA) and classified as a 2A school by the University Interscholastic League. It is part of the Johnson City Independent School District located in north central Blanco County. In 1963, the school was renamed in honor of President Lyndon B. Johnson who was a 1924 graduate of Johnson City High School. During 2022‍–‍2023, Johnson High School had an enrollment of 247 students and a student to teacher ratio of 10.37. The school received an overall rating of "B" from the Texas Education Agency for the 2024‍–‍2025 school year.

== Athletics ==
While the school's official name is LBJ High, the athletic teams go by Johnson City. The Eagles compete in the following sports:

- Baseball
- Basketball
- Cross Country
- Football
- Softball
- Tennis
- Track and Field
- Volleyball

=== State Titles ===
- Baseball
  - 2011(1A)
- Boys Basketball
  - 1947(B)
- Volleyball
  - 2024(2A/D1)

== Band ==
- Marching Band State Champions
  - 1989(2A)
