= Blowout, Texas =

Blowout
- Unincorporated community
- Location within the state of Texas Blowout (the United States)
- Coordinates: 30°26′50″N 98°34′39″W
- Country: United States
- State: Texas
- County: Blanco
- Elevation: 1,263 ft (385 m)
- Time zone: UTC-6 (Central (CST))
  - Summer (DST): UTC-5 (CDT)
- GNIS feature ID: 1379432

Blowout is an unincorporated community in Blanco County, Texas, United States.

== History ==
Davis Blowout Cave entrance in 2013

Blowout dates back to 1854, when a group of two-dozen homesteaders moved to the area from Kentucky and settled on the east side of Comanche Creek near Comanche Spring, about three miles below the origin of the creek. It began to grow into a community as more settlers arrived and moved upstream. There is little trace of the community today, as only several scattered houses are located among the rocky hills.

The settlement is named after a nearby cave known as Davis Blowout Cave, Davis Cave or Blowout Cave. It is located in a hillside on the east side of the creek, about a mile above Comanche Spring. There are multiple origins as to how the cave acquired the name "Blowout", but each version involves a bat guano explosion from the cave, hence the name. One anecdote claimed that lightning had struck the mouth of the cave, igniting a deposit of guano which exploded. A different tale involved a Native American being chased by a bear; the bear ran into the cave and the Native American threw a torch into it, igniting the guano. Another account published in the 1871 Texas Almanac claimed instead that the fire was set bv a hunter in 1856 in order to drive out a bear and mentioned that the cave burned and smoldered for two years after the explosion.

Davis Blowout Cave is considered to be one of the major Mexican free-tailed bat caves of Texas, with an estimated summertime maternity colony of 2 to 4 million bats. It has been the site of several important scientific studies of Tadarida brasiliensis mexicana, a subspecies of the free-tailed bat. A small colony of Myotis velifer was also reported to occasionally reside. Blowout Cave is believed to have been mined for its guano since the American Civil War and as recently as the 1940s. By 1987, the cave had been privately owned by the same family for many years.

In 1875, the community had several businesses. A post office was established at Blowout that year and remained in operation until 1918. It ran through Fredericksburg to Willow City to Blowout. Mail was also delivered from nearby Burnet. There was one brief interruption when the creeks and rivers flooded due to heavy rain and when the mail carrier was arrested for "abstracting money". Settlers sold wagon loads of bat guano for fertilizer until the business declined. Afterwards, a local rancher named Frank Lacy discovered gold in a nearby creek in 1896, causing a brief gold rush in the community.

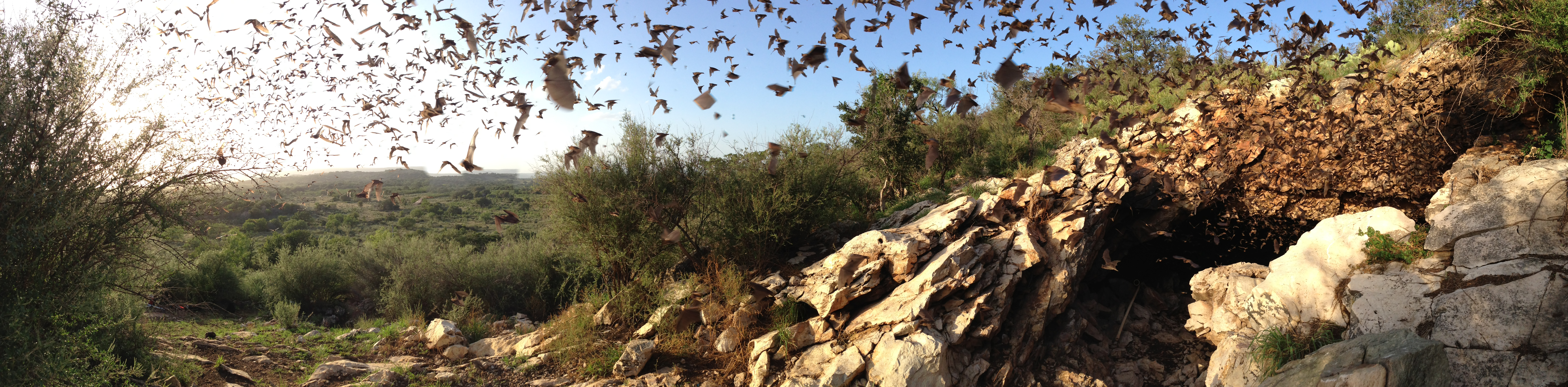
Bats emerging from Davis Blowout Cave

== Geography ==
Blowout is located 15 mi (24 km) northwest of Johnson City in northwestern Blanco County.

== Education ==
Blowout is served by the Johnson City Independent School District.

== Media ==
- KTSN-FM, a radio station (88.9 FM) licensed to serve Blowout.
