= Old Blanco County Courthouse =

- U.S. Historic district – Contributing property
- Texas State Antiquities Landmark
- Recorded Texas Historic Landmark
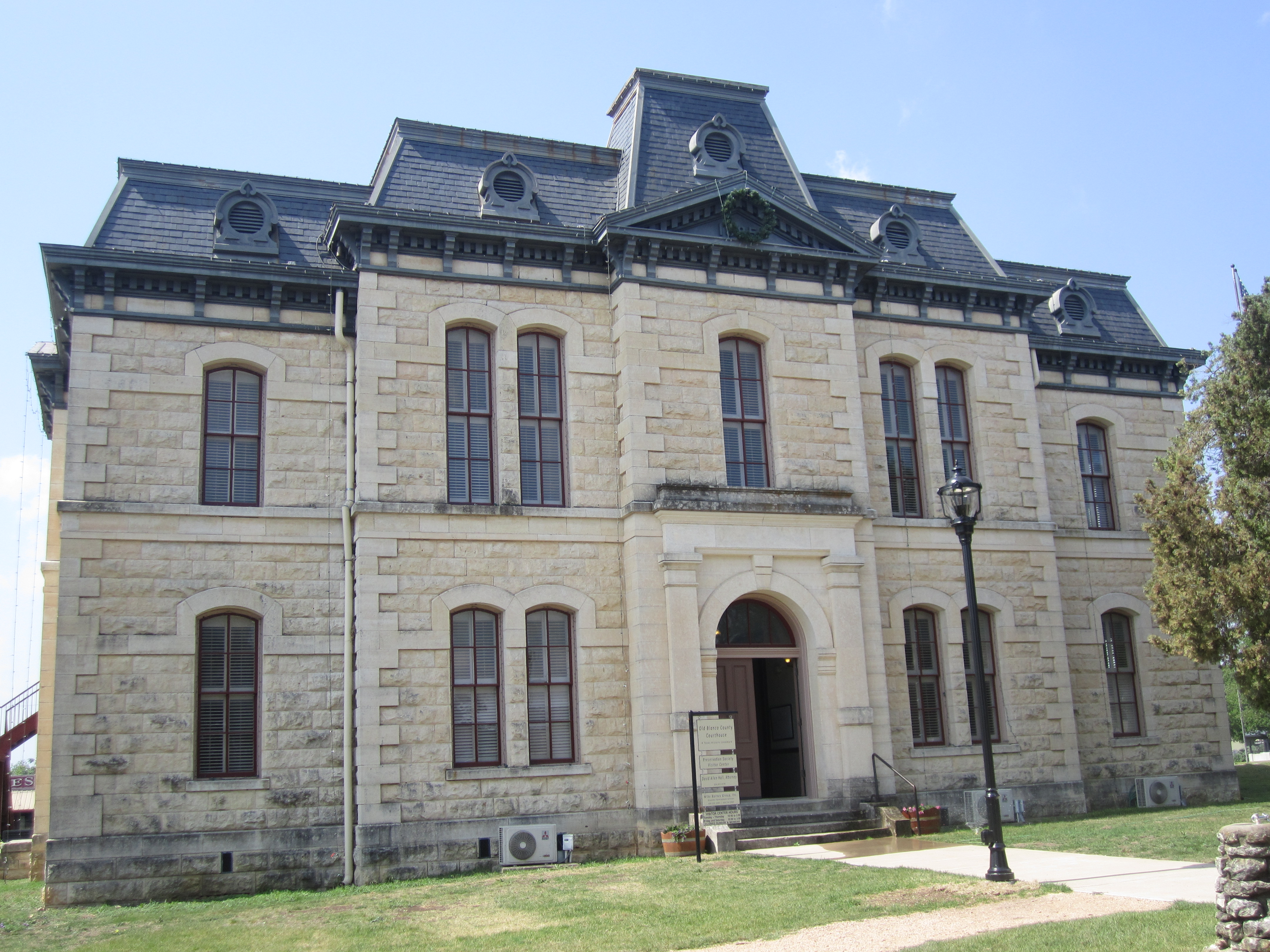
- Old Blanco County Courthouse in 2011

- Location within Texas Location within the United States
- Location: 310 Main St. Blanco, Texas
- Coordinates: 30°5′37″N 98°25′26″W
- Area: 1.77 acres (0.72 ha)
- Built: 1886
- Built by: Phil P. Cage, C.P. Boon
- Architect: Frederick Ernst Ruffini
- Architectural style: Second Empire
- Website: Old Blanco County Courthouse
- Part of: Blanco Historic District (ID91000890)
- TSAL No.: 8200002435
- RTHL No.: 428

Significant dates
- Designated CP: July 16, 1991
- Designated TSAL: January 1, 2004
- Designated RTHL: 1972

Old Blanco County Courthouse is located on the corner of 3rd and Main Streets in Blanco, in the U.S. state of Texas. Designed by architect Frederick Ernst Ruffini in the Second Empire style, it opened in 1886. When the county seat was moved to Johnson City in 1890, the old courthouse was repurposed as an office building. For almost a decade beginning in 1893, it was used as classrooms for local students while a new schoolhouse was being built, and in again 1919 when the schoolhouse fell into disrepair. For the next half century, the building served multiple tenants, including banks, tax collectors, entertainment venues, a museum, a restaurant and the local newspaper. For 24 years, the old courthouse was the area hospital. It was designated a Recorded Texas Historic Landmark in 1972.

It was purchased in 1986 by a private individual at Stonewall who planned to move it to his property. Local citizenry immediately responded by forming the Old Blanco County Courthouse Preservation Society to save the building, and by pressing the Blanco City Council to designate an Historical District ordinance to prevent the same fate from happening to other historic structures. The Society's initial effort of a bake sale raised a meager $750.00 to save the courthouse. The campaign eventually received nationwide press coverage, and garnered support and donations from high-profile individuals in Texas. Upon a successful outcome of their efforts, the old building underwent an exterior renovation. Texas Governor George W. Bush presided over the 1998 re-opening of the courthouse.

Currently, the old courthouse is a multi-use building being leased to business tenants and rented out for special events. The Coen brothers filmed the building's interior for the 2010 film True Grit.

== See also ==
- Blanco County Courthouse (Texas)
- National Register of Historic Places listings in Blanco County, Texas
- Recorded Texas Historic Landmarks in Blanco County
- List of county courthouses in Texas
