= Cypress Mill, Texas =

- Unincorporated community
- Location within Texas Location within the United States
- Coordinates: 30°22′52″N 98°15′2″W
- Country: United States
- State: Texas
- County: Blanco
- Elevation: 978 ft (298 m)
- Time zone: UTC-6 (Central (CST))
  - Summer (DST): UTC-5 (CDT)
- Area code: 830
- GNIS feature ID: 1379628

Cypress Mill is an unincorporated community in Blanco County, in the U.S. state of Texas. According to the Handbook of Texas, the community had a population of 56 in 2000.

== Geography ==
Cypress Mill is located on Farm to Market Road 962, 13 mi (21 km) northeast of Johnson City in northeastern Blanco County. It is also located 40 mi (64 km) west of Austin.

=== Climate ===
The climate in this area is characterized by hot, humid summers and generally mild to cool winters. According to the Köppen Climate Classification system, Cypress Mill has a humid subtropical climate, abbreviated "Cfa" on climate maps.

== Education ==
Cypress Mill is served by the Johnson City Independent School District.
