= National Register of Historic Places listings in Blanco County, Texas =

Location of Blanco County in Texas

This is a list of the National Register of Historic Places listings in Blanco County, Texas.

This is intended to be a complete list of properties and districts listed on the National Register of Historic Places in Blanco County, Texas. There are two district and two individual properties listed on the National Register in the county. One district includes an individual property and a State Antiquities Landmark both of which are Recorded Texas Historic Landmarks. The other district is a National Historic Park and includes another Recorded Texas Historic Landmark.

This National Park Service list is complete through NPS recent listings posted March 21, 2025.

== Current listings ==
The locations of National Register properties and districts may be seen in a mapping service provided.

	Name on the Register	Image	Date listed	Location	City or town	Description
1	Blanco Historic District	Blanco Historic District	July 16, 1991 (#91000890)	Roughly bounded by Fifth St., Live Oak St., Town Cr. and rear property lines W of Main St. 30°05′52″N 98°25′20″W	Blanco	Includes State Antiquities Landmark, Recorded Texas Historic Landmarks
2	Adrian Edwards Conn House	Adrian Edwards Conn House	November 19, 1971 (#71000921)	Jct. of U.S. 281 and SW boundary of courthouse square 30°05′49″N 98°25′22″W	Blanco	Part of Blanco Historic District; Recorded Texas Historic Landmark
3	Lyndon B. Johnson National Historical Park	Lyndon B. Johnson National Historical Park	December 2, 1969 (#69000202)	Lyndon B. Johnson National Historical Park; 30°16′31″N 98°24′37″W	Johnson City	Extends into Gillespie County; includes Recorded Texas Historic Landmark
4	Round Mountain Stage-Coach Inn and Stable	Round Mountain Stage-Coach Inn and Stable	March 31, 1978 (#78002896)	RM 962 off U.S. 281; 30°25′41″N 98°20′23″W	Round Mountain	

== See also ==
- National Register of Historic Places listings in Texas
- Recorded Texas Historic Landmarks in Blanco County
