= Rocky Creek, Texas =

- Unincorporated community
- Location within Texas Location within the United States
- Coordinates: 30°15′13″N 98°31′37″W
- Country: United States
- State: Texas
- County: Blanco
- Elevation: 1,355 ft (413 m)
- Time zone: UTC-6 (Central (CST))
  - Summer (DST): UTC-5 (CDT)
- Area code: 830
- GNIS feature ID: 1378976

Rocky Creek is an unincorporated community in Blanco County, in the U.S. state of Texas. According to the Handbook of Texas, the community had a population of 20 in 2000. It is sometimes simply called "Rocky".

== History ==
The area in what is known as Rocky Creek today was first settled in the 1880s. It was named after a nearby creek. The community had a cemetery by 1880. A cemetery association was established in the community to help preserve and promote its maintenance in 1974. Its population was 20 in 2000 with several farms.

== Geography ==
Rocky Creek is located on U.S. Highway 290, 8 mi (13 km) southwest of Johnson City in west-central Blanco County.

== Education ==
The community's first school was built in the late 1880s. It was shown on county maps in the 1930s. When it closed, the building was restored and became Rocky Community Church. It then became a community center and was associated with a nearby school named Pleasant Hill, thus giving it the name Rocky-Pleasant Hill. Today, Rocky Creek is served by the Johnson City Independent School District.
