= Flugrath, Texas =

- Unincorporated community
- Location within Texas Location within the United States
- Coordinates: 30°6′11″N 98°31′11″W
- Country: United States
- State: Texas
- County: Blanco
- Elevation: 1,421 ft (433 m)
- Time zone: UTC-6 (Central (CST))
  - Summer (DST): UTC-5 (CDT)
- Area code: 830
- GNIS feature ID: 2034983

Flugrath is an unincorporated community in Blanco County, in the U.S. state of Texas. According to the Handbook of Texas, the community had a population of 20 in 2000.

== Geography ==
Flugrath is located on Farm to Market Road 1888 on the Blanco River, 6 mi (9.7 km) west of Blanco in southwestern Blanco County.

== Education ==
Flugrath is served by the Blanco Independent School District.
