= Peyton, Texas =

- Unincorporated community
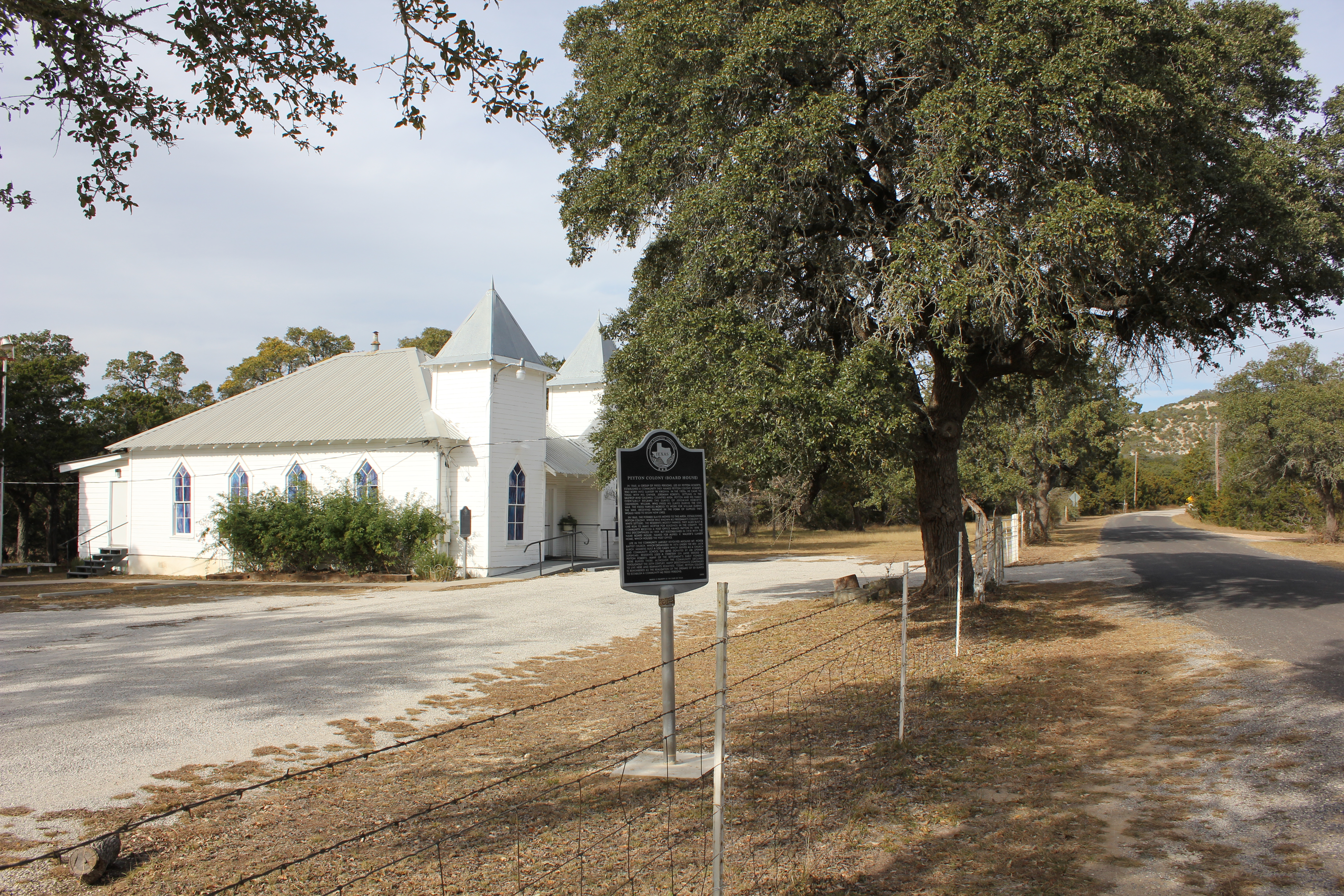
- Mt. Horeb Baptist Church in Peyton

- Location within Texas Location within the United States
- Coordinates: 30°6′50″N 98°18′19″W
- Country: United States
- State: Texas
- County: Blanco
- Elevation: 1,352 ft (412 m)
- Time zone: UTC-6 (Central (CST))
  - Summer (DST): UTC-5 (CDT)
- Area code: 830
- GNIS feature ID: 1378843

Peyton is an unincorporated community in Blanco County, in the U.S. state of Texas. According to the Handbook of Texas, the community had a population of 30 in 2000.

== History ==
Established by formerly enslaved people around 1865, the community was named for Peyton Roberts, one of the founders. Peyton was also known by the names Payton, Peyton Colony, and Boardhouse (because the post office was located in A.V. Walker's house made of board, which became the first in the community). After he was emancipated, Peyton Roberts left Lockhart for the area that would become Peyton. Roberts acquired the land through preemption, and other early residents would follow suit. Even though preemption ended in 1876, land grants continued to be issued as late as 1880. Peyton had its own post office from 1898 to 1909 and again from 1918 to 1930. Even though the community has not been listed on county maps since then, it still exists today. The colony site also has a cemetery with 176 graves, including many of the founders. In 2000, the population of Peyton was 30.

Peyton Roberts was born as a slave in Virginia. In the 1820s, he moved to Texas with his owner, Jeremiah Roberts, settling in the Bastrop and Caldwell counties area. Peyton and his family eventually became the slaves of his grandson, William, who freed his slaves during the American Civil War. The freed families agreed to work for William during the war, receiving payment in the form of supplies they would need to begin new lives. It was known as Freedman's Colony to white settlers. The residents mostly farmed for a living.

Roberts also built a lime kiln which was used to make the mortar for the buildings erected in Peyton. It was restored in 1960 near a park.

Founded in 1874, Mt. Horeb Baptist Church was the first church in Peyton and was directed by Rev. Jack Burch. Jim Upshear, who moved to the area from Virginia with his wife by wagon train, donated the land for the church's permanent site.

== Geography ==
Peyton is located just west of the intersection of Ranch to Market Roads 165 and 2325 near Boardhouse Creek, 7 mi (11 km) east of Blanco in southeastern Blanco County. Peyton is also located 23 mi (37 km) southeast of Johnson City, 36 mi (58 km) east of Fredericksburg, 56 mi (90 km) north of San Antonio, and 40 mi (64 km) southwest of Austin.

== Education ==
While the church also functioned as a school at first, Peyton would later build a small log schoolhouse. The school served grades 1-8 from 1877 to 1963. Today, the community is served by the Blanco Independent School District.
