= Round Mountain, Texas =

Town in Blanco County, Texas, United States

- Town
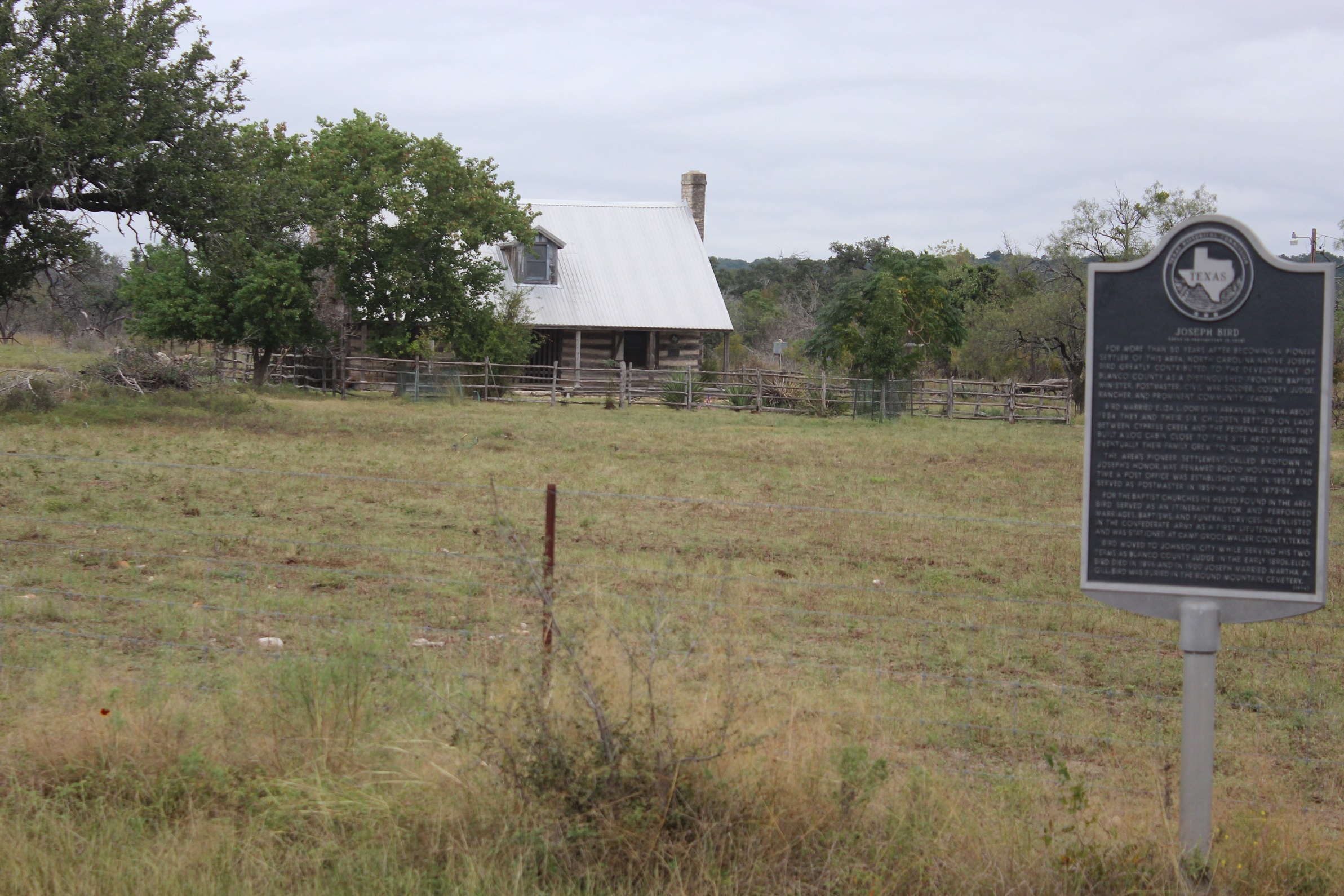
- Joseph and Eliza Bird residence in Round Mountain

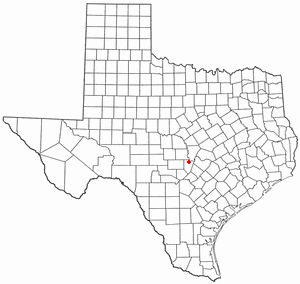
- Location of Round Mountain, Texas

- Coordinates: 30°26′21″N 98°21′50″W
- Country: United States
- State: Texas
- County: Blanco

Area
  - Total: 2.31 sq mi (5.97 km^{2})
  - Land: 2.31 sq mi (5.97 km^{2})
  - Water: 0 sq mi (0.00 km^{2})
- Elevation: 1,263 ft (385 m)

Population (2020)
  - Total: 101
  - Density: 43.8/sq mi (16.9/km^{2})
- Time zone: UTC-6 (Central (CST))
  - Summer (DST): UTC-5 (CDT)
- ZIP code: 78663
- Area code: 830
- FIPS code: 48-63476
- GNIS feature ID: 2412580

Round Mountain is a town in Blanco County, Texas, United States. The population was 101 at the 2020 census.

== Geography ==
Round Mountain is located in northern Blanco County along U.S. Route 281. It is 12 miles (19 km) north of Johnson City, the county seat, and 11 miles (18 km) south of Marble Falls. Downtown Austin is 46 miles (74 km) to the east.

According to the United States Census Bureau, the town of Round Mountain has a total area of 2.3 square miles (6.0 km^{2}), all land.

=== Climate ===
The climate in this area is characterized by hot, humid summers and generally mild to cool winters. According to the Köppen Climate Classification system, Round Mountain has a humid subtropical climate, abbreviated "Cfa" on climate maps.

== Demographics ==
Historical population
Census	Pop.	Note	%±
1990	59		—
2000	111		88.1%
2010	181		63.1%
2020	101		−44.2%
U.S. Decennial Census

=== 2020 census ===
Round Mountain racial composition (NH = Non-Hispanic) (Note: Note: the US Census treats Hispanic/Latino as an ethnic category. This table excludes Latinos from the racial categories and assigns them to a separate category. Hispanics/Latinos can be of any race.)
Race	Number	Percentage
White (NH)	69	68.32%
Mixed/Multi-Racial (NH)	4	3.96%
Hispanic or Latino	28	27.72%
Total	101	

As of the 2020 United States census, there were 101 people, 57 households, and 31 families residing in the town.

=== 2000 census ===
As of the census of 2000, there were 111 people, 41 households, and 33 families residing in the town. The population density was 48.3 inhabitants per square mile (18.6/km^{2}). There were 46 housing units at an average density of 20.0 per square mile (7.7/km^{2}). The racial makeup of the town was 87.39% White, 9.01% from other races, and 3.60% from two or more races. Hispanic or Latino of any race were 18.02% of the population.

There were 41 households, out of which 29.3% had children under the age of 18 living with them, 73.2% were married couples living together, 4.9% had a female householder with no husband present, and 19.5% were non-families. 17.1% of all households were made up of individuals, and 12.2% had someone living alone who was 65 years of age or older. The average household size was 2.71 and the average family size was 3.06.

In the town, the population was spread out, with 25.2% under the age of 18, 7.2% from 18 to 24, 19.8% from 25 to 44, 32.4% from 45 to 64, and 15.3% who were 65 years of age or older. The median age was 43 years. For every 100 females, there were 85.0 males. For every 100 females age 18 and over, there were 88.6 males.

The median income for a household in the town was $39,500, and the median income for a family was $44,375. Males had a median income of $30,938 versus $25,833 for females. The per capita income for the town was $16,220. There were no families and 2.3% of the population living below the poverty line, including no under eighteens and none of those over 64.

== See also ==
- List of municipalities in Texas
