= Garrison Brothers Distillery =

Distillery in Hye, Texas, US

- Founded: 2006
- Headquarters: Hye, Texas, United States

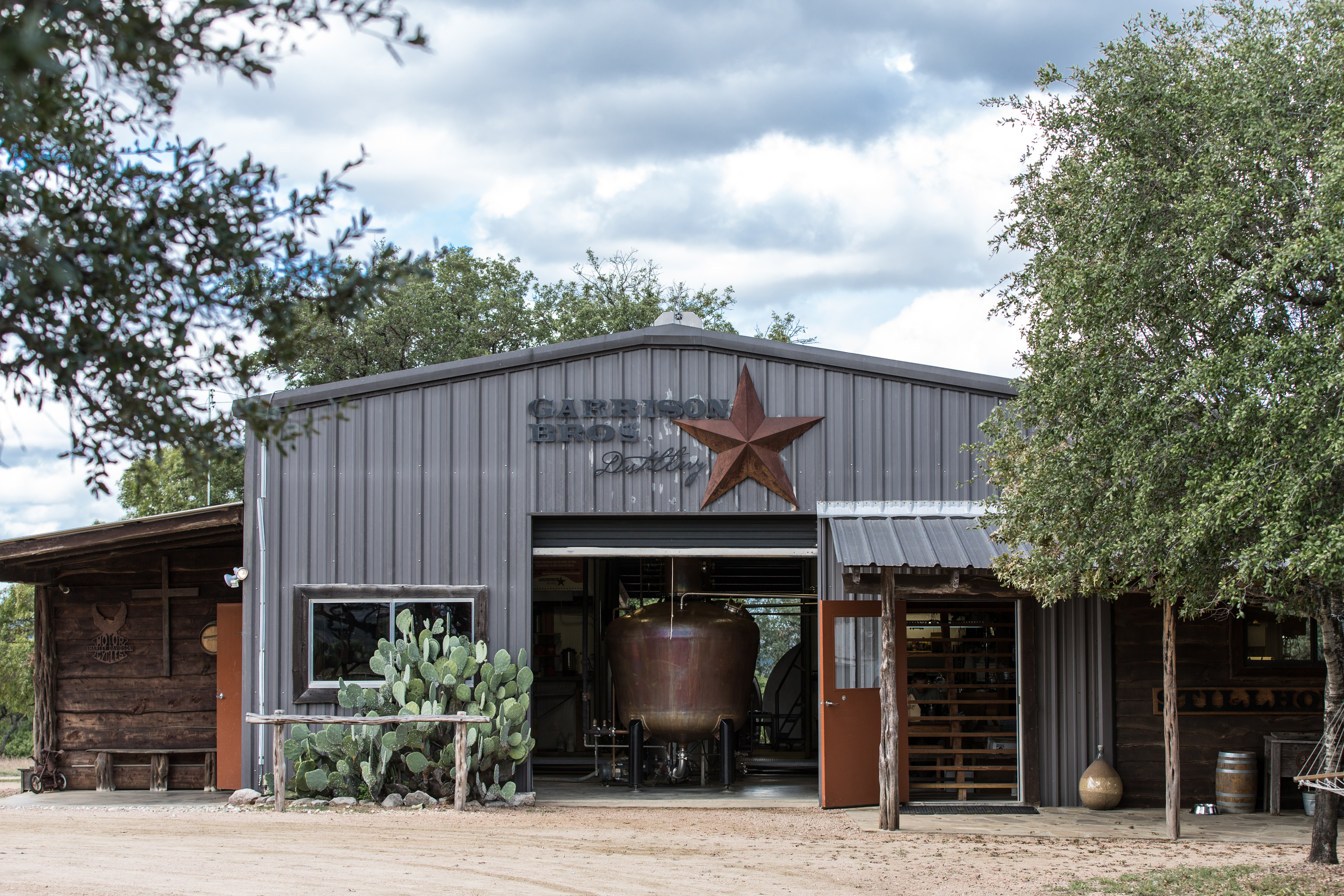
Garrison Brothers Stillhouse

Garrison Brothers Distillery, located in Hye, Texas, in the beautiful Hill Country, is the first and oldest legal whiskey distillery in Texas, and the first distillery outside of Kentucky to produce authentic, handcrafted, corn-to-cork bourbon whiskey—and only bourbon whiskey. In 2006, the distillery was granted the first stiller's permit for bourbon outside of Kentucky and Tennessee, which makes it the oldest legal bourbon distillery in Texas. Founded in 2006 by Dan and Nancy Garrison, Garrison Brothers bourbon first entered the market in 2010.

Garrison Brothers bourbon is sold across all 50 US states and in five countries. The Texas bourbon has earned more than 800 awards and the distillery is visited by over 50,000 people a year.

Garrison Brothers' flagship "Cowboy Bourbon" consists of a few thousand barrel proof bottles released each year. The first batch was released in 2013, and a new batch has been released each year since 2015.

Distributor Allied Lomar Inc., who once sold a bourbon by the name "Cowboy Little Barrel", brought a trademark suit against the distillery due to its use of a similar product name. On July 18, 2018, the United States Court of Appeals for the Fifth Circuit affirmed an earlier jury verdict that allowed Garrison Brothers to use the name "Cowboy Bourbon" for Garrison's flagship product, ruling that the earlier trademark had been abandoned.

In 2018, Garrison Brothers started a 501(c)(3) nonprofit called "Good Bourbon for a Good Cause" to raise money for renovating Balmorhea State Park and other various causes focused on preserving Texas lands, veterans' causes, and emergency community assistance.

== Awards ==
Platinum Medal 2025, The Chilled 100 Spirits Awards, Small Batch.

Double Gold 2025, San Francisco World Spirits Awards, Single Barrel Cask Strength.

Platinum 2025, TAG Global Spirits Awards, Balmorhea.

Best in Class 2025, New York World Spirits Competition, Guadalupe.

Best Craft Whiskey Distillery, 2017 USA Today Readers' Choice

"US Micro Whisky of the Year" for Garrison Brothers Balmorhea Bourbon from spirits writer Jim Murray in his book Jim Murray's Whisky Bible 2019 (ISBN 978-0993298639).
