= Blanco County, Texas =

County in Texas, United States

- County
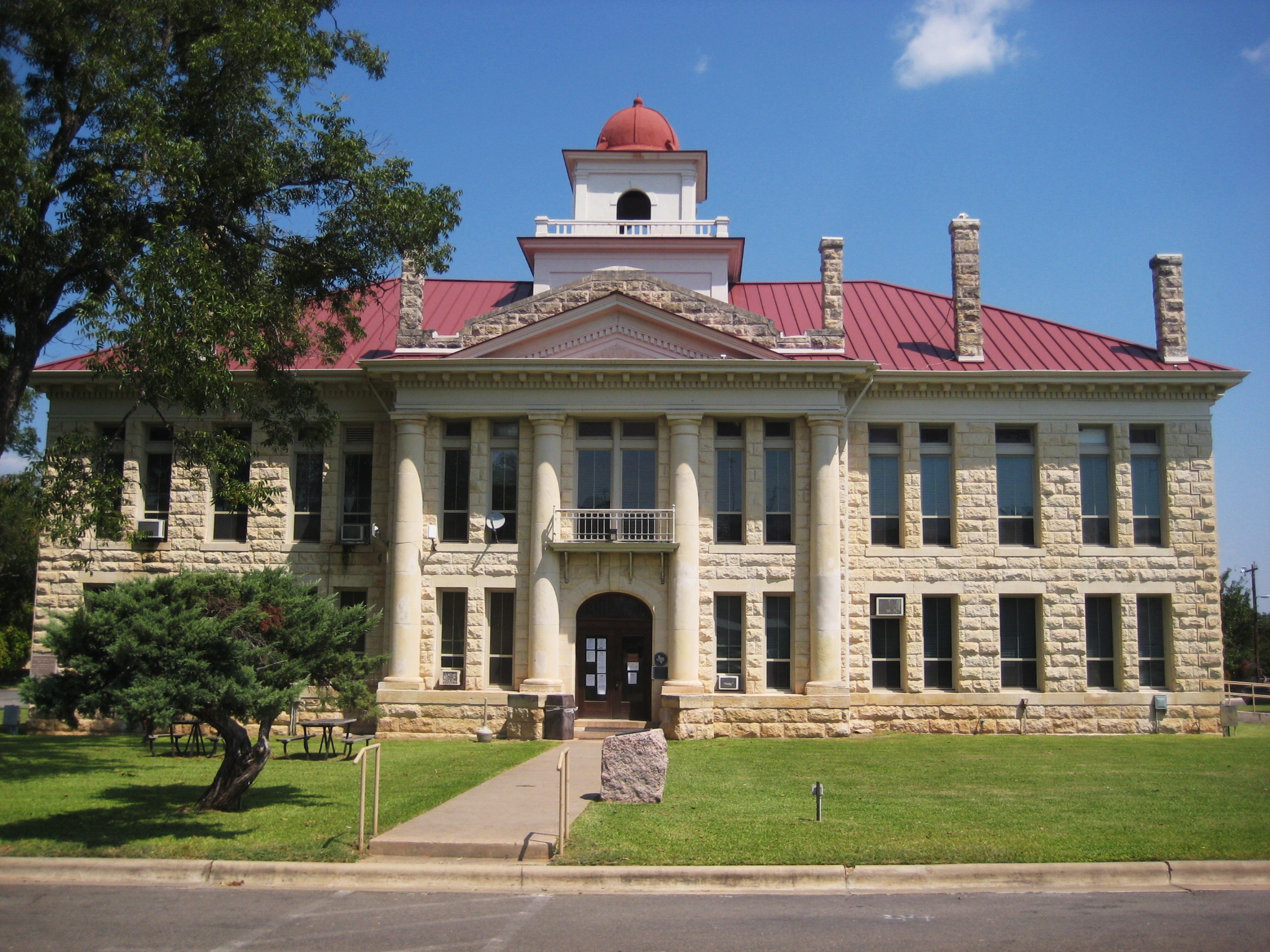
- The Blanco County Courthouse of 1916 was the first permanent courthouse built after the county seat moved to Johnson City in 1890.

- Location within the U.S. state of Texas
- Coordinates: 30°16′N 98°24′W
- Country: United States
- State: Texas
- Founded: February 12, 1858
- Named for: Blanco River
- Seat: Johnson City
- Largest city: Blanco

Area
  - Total: 713 sq mi (1,850 km^{2})
  - Land: 709 sq mi (1,840 km^{2})
  - Water: 4.2 sq mi (11 km^{2}) 0.6%

Population (2020)
  - Total: 11,374
  - Estimate (2025): 13,581 ▲
  - Density: 16.0/sq mi (6.19/km^{2})
- Time zone: UTC−6 (Central)
  - Summer (DST): UTC−5 (CDT)
- Congressional district: 21st
- Website: Official website

Blanco County (Spanish: "white", /ˈblæŋkoʊ/ BLANG-koh) is a United States county located in the U.S. state of Texas. It is located in Central Texas and its county seat is Johnson City.

As of the 2020 census, the population was 11,374.

The county is named for the Blanco River that traverses the county.

== History ==
- 1150 AD Indigenous peoples first inhabitants, possible ancestors of the Lipan Apache.
- 1721 José de Azlor y Virto de Vera names the Blanco River.
- 1826 Benjamin Milam is given a contract to settle 300 families between the Colorado and Guadalupe rivers.
- 1836 Comanches claim all land in Blanco County.
- 1847 Meusebach–Comanche Treaty
- 1850s Samuel Ealy Johnson, Sr., grandfather of President Lyndon B. Johnson, and his brother Jesse Thomas Johnson, set up a cattle business in Johnson City. The town is named after their nephew James Polk Johnson. The Johnson family emigrated from Alabama.
- 1854-1855 Captain James Hughes Callahan and Eli Clemens Hinds become Blanco's first white settlers. Joseph Bird establishes Birdtown, now Round Mountain. General John D. Pitts, Judge William S. Jones, Andrew M. Lindsay, James Hughes Callahan and F.W. Chandler charter the Pittsburgh Land Company. They purchase the league granted to Horace Eggleston by the government of Coahuila y Tejas in 1835 and lay out the town of Pittsburgh, Texas, named for General Pitts, across the river from the site of future Blanco.
- 1858, February 12 - Blanco County is formed from parts of Comal, Hays, Burnet and Gillespie, and is named for the Blanco River. County seat is also named Blanco.
- 1860 Population of 1218, includes 98 slaves. Settlers are mostly Anglo-Saxon Protestants hailing from Tennessee and Alabama. Agriculture and livestock are central to the economy.
- 1861 County votes against secession from the Union.
- 1862 Legislature establishes Kendall from part of Blanco southwestern border. Legislature in turn incorporates parts of Hays and Burnet into Blanco.
- 1872 Texas Rangers attacked Comanches cooking stolen meat after a raid at Deer Creek.
- 1873 The last Indian raid in the county happens when Thomas Phelps and his wife are killed by Comanches near North Cypress Creek.
- 1885 Replacement of courthouse by limestone structure now known as “The Old Courthouse”.
- 1883 Blanco High School is chartered.
- 1890 Johnson City becomes the new county seat.
- 1910 Cotton becomes one of the county's most important crops.
- 1900-1930 County farmers diversify into peanuts, peaches, pecans, pears, plums, grapes, and figs.
- 1915 Samuel Ealy Johnson, Jr. and his wife Rebekah Baines Johnson, parents of President Lyndon Baines Johnson, move into their home in Johnson City with their five children, Lucia, Sam Houston, Josefa, Rebekah, and Lyndon Baines Johnson.
- 1929 More than 20,000 peach and pecan trees harvested in the county.
- 1933-1942 Civilian Conservation Corps public work relief program helps improve county parks and infrastructure.
- 1934 Blanco State Park opens.
- 1937 Lyndon Baines Johnson launches his first campaign for Congress from the east porch of the family's Johnson City home.
- 1938 LBJ becomes a fierce advocate for rural electrification. First light bulb turned on in rural Blanco County.
- 1960s Lyndon B. Johnson becomes Vice President of the United States and subsequently President of the United States. Tourism becomes an important industry.
- 1970 Pedernales Falls State Park opens to the public.

== Demographics ==
Historical population
Census	Pop.	Note	%±
1860	1,281		—
1870	1,187		−7.3%
1880	3,583		201.9%
1890	4,649		29.8%
1900	4,703		1.2%
1910	4,311		−8.3%
1920	4,063		−5.8%
1930	3,842		−5.4%
1940	4,264		11.0%
1950	3,780		−11.4%
1960	3,657		−3.3%
1970	3,567		−2.5%
1980	4,681		31.2%
1990	5,972		27.6%
2000	8,418		41.0%
2010	10,497		24.7%
2020	11,374		8.4%
2025 (est.)	13,581	▲	19.4%
U.S. Decennial Census; 1850–2010 2010 2020

=== 2020 census ===
As of the 2020 census, the county had a population of 11,374. The median age was 52.6 years. 17.2% of residents were under the age of 18 and 28.3% of residents were 65 years of age or older. For every 100 females there were 97.4 males, and for every 100 females age 18 and over there were 95.4 males age 18 and over.

The racial makeup of the county was 81.4% White, 0.6% Black or African American, 0.8% American Indian and Alaska Native, 0.4% Asian, 0.1% Native Hawaiian and Pacific Islander, 6.6% from some other race, and 10.2% from two or more races. Hispanic or Latino residents of any race comprised 18.4% of the population.

<0.1% of residents lived in urban areas, while 100.0% lived in rural areas.

There were 4,787 households in the county, of which 23.1% had children under the age of 18 living in them. Of all households, 56.6% were married-couple households, 17.1% were households with a male householder and no spouse or partner present, and 22.5% were households with a female householder and no spouse or partner present. About 26.9% of all households were made up of individuals and 15.2% had someone living alone who was 65 years of age or older.

There were 6,056 housing units, of which 21.0% were vacant. Among occupied housing units, 78.8% were owner-occupied and 21.2% were renter-occupied. The homeowner vacancy rate was 1.8% and the rental vacancy rate was 9.3%.

=== Racial and ethnic composition ===
Blanco County, Texas – Racial and ethnic composition Note: the US Census treats Hispanic/Latino as an ethnic category. This table excludes Latinos from the racial categories and assigns them to a separate category. Hispanics/Latinos may be of any race.
Race / Ethnicity (NH = Non-Hispanic)	Pop 1980	Pop 1990	Pop 2000	Pop 2010	Pop 2020	% 1980	% 1990	% 2000	% 2010	% 2020
White alone (NH)	4,159	5,038	6,912	8,336	8,707	88.85%	84.36%	82.11%	79.41%	76.55%
Black or African American alone (NH)	77	56	60	62	68	1.64%	0.94%	0.71%	0.59%	0.60%
Native American or Alaska Native alone (NH)	3	17	27	47	36	0.06%	0.28%	0.32%	0.45%	0.32%
Asian alone (NH)	2	19	15	49	38	0.04%	0.32%	0.18%	0.47%	0.33%
Native Hawaiian or Pacific Islander alone (NH)	x	x	1	4	0	x	x	0.01%	0.04%	0.00%
Other race alone (NH)	8	2	10	5	70	0.17%	0.03%	0.12%	0.05%	0.62%
Mixed race or Multiracial (NH)	x	x	103	85	363	x	x	1.22%	0.81%	3.19%
Hispanic or Latino (any race)	432	840	1,290	1,909	2,092	9.23%	14.07%	15.32%	18.19%	18.39%
Total	4,681	5,972	8,418	10,497	11,374	100.00%	100.00%	100.00%	100.00%	100.00%

=== 2000 census ===
As of the 2000 census, there were 8,418 people, 3,303 households, and 2,391 families residing in the county. The population density was 12 people per square mile (4.6 people/km^{2}). There were 4,031 housing units at an average density of 6 units per square mile (2.3/km^{2}). The racial makeup of the county was 90.97% White, 0.74% Black or African American, 0.59% Native American, 0.19% Asian, 0.01% Pacific Islander, 5.88% from other races, and 1.62% from two or more races. 15.32% of the population were Hispanic or Latino of any race.

There were 3,303 households, out of which 30.40% had children under the age of 18 living with them, 61.50% were married couples living together, 7.20% had a female householder with no husband present, and 27.60% were non-families. 24.00% of all households were made up of individuals, and 10.80% had someone living alone who was 65 years of age or older. The average household size was 2.50 and the average family size was 2.96.

In the county, the population was spread out, with 24.40% under the age of 18, 6.20% from 18 to 24, 25.60% from 25 to 44, 27.10% from 45 to 64, and 16.70% who were 65 years of age or older. The median age was 41 years. For every 100 females, there were 97.70 males. For every 100 females age 18 and over, there were 94.90 males.

The median income for a household in the county was $39,369, and the median income for a family was $45,382. Males had a median income of $31,717 versus $21,879 for females. The per capita income for the county was $19,721. About 8.10% of families and 11.20% of the population were below the poverty line, including 14.20% of those under age 18 and 9.80% of those age 65 or over.

== Geography ==
According to the U.S. Census Bureau, the county has a total area of 713 square miles (1,850 km^{2}), of which 709 square miles (1,840 km^{2}) is land and 4.2 square miles (11 km^{2}) (0.6%) is water.

Blanco County is located in the Hill Country of central Texas, west of Austin and north of San Antonio. Two significant rivers, the Blanco and the Pedernales, flow through the county.

=== Major highways ===
- U.S. Highway 281
- U.S. Highway 290
- Loop 163
- Spur 356
- Ranch Road 1

=== Adjacent counties ===
- Burnet County (north)
- Travis County (northeast)
- Hays County (east)
- Comal County (southeast)
- Kendall County (southwest)
- Gillespie County (west)
- Llano County (northwest)

=== National protected area ===
- Lyndon B. Johnson National Historical Park (part)

=== Texas Parklands ===
- Pedernales Falls State Park

== Politics ==
United States presidential election results for Blanco County, Texas
Year	Republican		Democratic		Third party(ies)	
Year	No.	%	No.	%	No.	%
1912	126	19.30%	448	68.61%	79	12.10%
1916	235	26.55%	628	70.96%	22	2.49%
1920	378	22.13%	426	24.94%	904	52.93%
1924	317	29.41%	586	54.36%	175	16.23%
1928	615	53.25%	539	46.67%	1	0.09%
1932	127	9.29%	1,233	90.20%	7	0.51%
1936	313	22.81%	1,056	76.97%	3	0.22%
1940	520	33.18%	1,042	66.50%	5	0.32%
1944	533	35.25%	846	55.95%	133	8.80%
1948	497	31.68%	1,003	63.93%	69	4.40%
1952	919	56.80%	697	43.08%	2	0.12%
1956	796	56.14%	615	43.37%	7	0.49%
1960	557	39.96%	830	59.54%	7	0.50%
1964	290	19.49%	1,197	80.44%	1	0.07%
1968	614	42.14%	620	42.55%	223	15.31%
1972	1,215	71.68%	460	27.14%	20	1.18%
1976	1,015	51.89%	923	47.19%	18	0.92%
1980	1,434	62.32%	794	34.51%	73	3.17%
1984	1,957	73.43%	700	26.27%	8	0.30%
1988	1,680	61.79%	1,012	37.22%	27	0.99%
1992	1,370	44.07%	891	28.66%	848	27.28%
1996	1,919	57.87%	1,028	31.00%	369	11.13%
2000	2,777	73.72%	811	21.53%	179	4.75%
2004	3,277	71.49%	1,267	27.64%	40	0.87%
2008	3,418	69.20%	1,467	29.70%	54	1.09%
2012	3,638	73.16%	1,220	24.53%	115	2.31%
2016	4,212	74.09%	1,244	21.88%	229	4.03%
2020	5,443	72.97%	1,911	25.62%	105	1.41%
2024	6,447	75.64%	1,973	23.15%	103	1.21%

United States Senate election results for Blanco County, Texas1
Year	Republican		Democratic		Third party(ies)	
Year	No.	%	No.	%	No.	%
2024	6,243	73.47%	2,071	24.37%	183	2.15%

United States Senate election results for Blanco County, Texas2
Year	Republican		Democratic		Third party(ies)	
Year	No.	%	No.	%	No.	%
2020	5,457	73.66%	1,816	24.51%	135	1.82%

Texas Gubernatorial election results for Blanco County
Year	Republican		Democratic		Third party(ies)	
Year	No.	%	No.	%	No.	%
2022	5,142	75.91%	1,522	22.47%	110	1.62%

== Communities ==
=== Cities ===
- Blanco
- Johnson City (county seat)

=== Town ===
- Round Mountain

=== Unincorporated communities ===
- Blowout
- Cypress Mill
- Flugrath
- Hye
- Peyton
- Post Oak
- Rocky Creek
- Sandy
- Twin Sisters

== Education ==
School districts:

- Blanco Independent School District
- Fredericksburg Independent School District
- Johnson City Independent School District

Austin Community College is the designated community college for the county.

== See also ==
- USS Blanco County (LST-344)
- Lyndon B. Johnson National Historical Park
- National Register of Historic Places listings in Blanco County, Texas
- Recorded Texas Historic Landmarks in Blanco County
