= USS Blanco County =

United States Navy tank landing ship

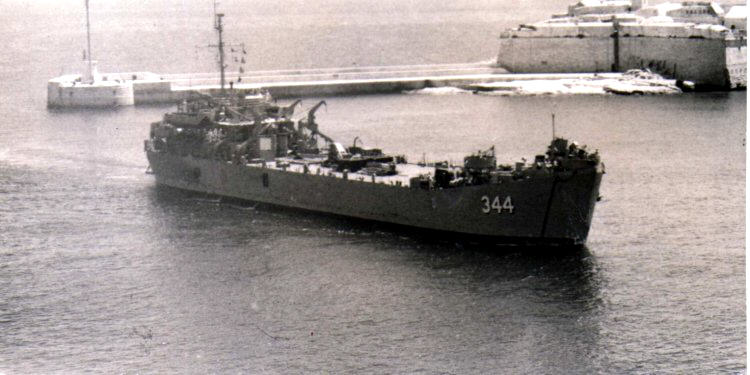
- USS Blanco County (LST-344) entering the Grand Harbour at Malta, c. 1957

History

United States
- Name: USS Blanco County (LST-344)
- Namesake: Blanco County, Texas
- Builder: Norfolk Navy Yard
- Laid down: 18 October 1942
- Launched: 15 December 1942
- Commissioned: 14 January 1943
- Decommissioned: 7 June 1946
- Recommissioned: 5 January 1952
- Decommissioned: 28 February 1956
- Renamed: USS Blanco County (LST-344), 1 July 1955
- Recommissioned: 9 June 1966
- Decommissioned: 3 October 1969
- Stricken: 15 September 1974
- Identification: IMO number: 7609908
- Honours and awards: 3 battle stars (WWII); 5 battle stars and Navy Unit Commendation (Vietnam)
- Fate: Sold for scrapping, July 1975

General characteristics
- Class & type: LST-1-class tank landing ship
- Displacement: 1,625 long tons (1,651 t) light; 4,080 long tons (4,145 t) full
- Length: 328 ft (100 m)
- Beam: 50 ft (15 m)
- Draft: Unloaded: Bow: 2 ft 4 in (0.71 m); Stern: 7 ft 6 in (2.29 m); Loaded : Bow: 8 ft 2 in (2.49 m); Stern: 14 ft 1 in (4.29 m)
- Depth: 8 ft (2.4 m) forward, 14 ft 4 in (4.37 m) aft (full load)
- Propulsion: 2 General Motors 12-567 diesel engines, two shafts, twin rudders
- Speed: 12 knots (22 km/h; 14 mph)
- Boats & landing craft carried: Two or six LCVPs
- Troops: 14-16 officers, 131-147 enlisted men
- Complement: 7-9 officers, 104-120 enlisted men
- Armament: 2 × twin 40 mm gun mounts w/Mk.51 directors; 4 × single 40 mm gun mounts; 12 × single 20 mm gun mounts

USS Blanco County (LST-344) was an LST-1-class tank landing ship built for the United States Navy during World War II. Named for Blanco County, Texas, she was the only U.S. Naval vessel to bear the name.

LST-344 was laid down on 18 October 1942 by the Norfolk Navy Yard; launched on 15 December 1942; sponsored by Mrs. H. H. Ward; and commissioned on 14 January 1943.

== Service history ==
=== Invasion of Italy, 1943–1944 ===
The tank landing ship conducted shakedown and amphibious training in the Chesapeake Bay until early April. On 2 April, she sailed for New York. There she loaded LCT-445 and took on passengers before sailing in convoy on the 28th for the Mediterranean.

LST-344 arrived in Arzeu, Algeria on 26 May and began preparations for the Allied invasion of Sicily. At the end of the first week in July, the ship staged through Algiers as a unit of Task Force (TF) 81 (Dime Force) on her way to the southeastern coast of Sicily. She and her colleagues arrived off Gela around 0100 on the morning of 10 July. LST-344, however, did not approach the beach at H-hour, 0245. Instead, she remained well offshore until mid-morning. During that time, several German Messerschmitt Bf 109 fighter bombers tried unsuccessfully to skip bomb her. After she linked up with the causeway at Gela, several shore batteries tried to pepper her but, like the aircraft, scored no direct hits. Those bombardments only spattered her with shell fragments wounding two soldiers but causing no major damage to the ship. The tank landing ship completed unloading at about 1230, retracted from beach and causeway, and headed seaward. She remained about two miles offshore until 12 July when she headed for Bizerte, Tunisia to begin a series of reinforcement shuttles between North Africa and Sicily. The ship made five additional beachings at Gela between 12 July and the first week in September.

On 7 September LST-344 sailed from Bizerte as a unit of TF 85, the Northern Attack Force for the assault at Salerno and arrived off her destination on 9 September. She did not beach on the day of the initial assault, but rather remained well off shore parrying sporadic German air attacks. On the 10th, however, she moved onto Red Beach and completed unloading in 90 minutes. Immediately thereafter, she shaped a course back to Bizerte where she arrived on 12 September. Once again, she made five more reinforcement voyages from Bizerte to Salerno and Taranto between mid-September and 19 October. After that, she made supply runs between Bizerte, Tripoli, and Algerian ports.

=== Invasion of France, 1943–1945 ===
On 22 November the ship departed Algeria on her way to Great Britain. She arrived at Plymouth, England on 5 December. LST-344 began preparations for the Normandy Invasion. For the next six months, she conducted amphibious training at various locations throughout the British Isles. The tank landing ship departed Southampton during the late afternoon of 5 June 1944 in a convoy bound for Baie de la Seine, France. On D-Day, 6 June, she disembarked troops and unloaded vehicles and equipment at Omaha Beach. Late that night, she started back to Southampton to pick up additional men and equipment. The ship went to general quarters at 2320 to ward off an attack by Junkers Ju 88 bombers, and reported having helped to splash one of the attackers. The tank landing ship returned to Southampton safely on 7 June. For the next 10 months, LST-344 shuttled back and forth across the English Channel, first to the invasion beaches and, later, to the various French Channel ports after they had been captured and reopened.

=== Return to the US, 1945–1946 ===
She departed Le Havre for the last time on 31 March 1945. The ship visited Southampton, Falmouth, and Plymouth in England, as well as Belfast in Northern Ireland. On 5 May she departed the latter port and shaped a course for the United States. LST-344 entered port at Norfolk, Virginia on 31 May. However, was underway again on 4 June on her way to New York and an overhaul at Sullivan's Shipyard in Brooklyn. The tank landing ship returned to Norfolk on 28 August, a fortnight after Japan capitulated, and spent the next three weeks training in the Chesapeake Bay. After another visit to New York between 20 and 27 September, the ship headed south to Florida for inactivation. LST-344 arrived in Green Cove Springs, Florida on 30 September 1945 though she was not finally decommissioned and placed in reserve until 7 June 1946.

=== Mediterranean, 1951–1956 ===
Late in 1951, the tank landing ship was moved to the Norfolk Naval Shipyard to prepare for a return to active service. LST-344 was recommissioned at Norfolk on 5 January 1952. After shakedown training in the Chesapeake Bay, the ship stood out of Norfolk on 19 July with cargo bound for Port Lyautey in French Morocco. LST-344 returned to Norfolk from North Africa on 26 August. The four years following her return to active service saw a number of voyages to carry cargo to locations in the West Indies, North Africa, and the Mediterranean Sea. She also participated in several amphibious exercises during that period. Also during that time on 1 July 1955 the tank landing ship was named USS Blanco County (LST-344). On 28 February 1956 she was placed out of commission again and consigned to the reserve fleet at Green Cove Springs.

=== Vietnam War, 1965–1969 ===
Late in 1965, Blanco County was moved to Baltimore to undergo another reactivation overhaul at the Bethlehem Shipbuilding & Drydock Company. Early in June 1966 she went to Little Creek, Virginia where she was recommissioned on 9 June 1966. The tank landing ship spent several weeks in refresher training before departing Little Creek on 24 August on her way to the Far East. Steaming via Charleston, the Panama Canal, San Diego, Pearl Harbor, and Guam, the ship arrived in Da Nang, South Vietnam in November. On the 26th, she reported for duty with TF 115 for service in Operation Market Time, the interdiction of waterborne logistics to the insurgent forces in South Vietnam. She alternated service along the coast of Vietnam with periods spent in other locations in the western Pacific, notably in the Philippines, at Guam, in Japan, and at Taiwan. On 10 October 1967 Blanco County began her first tour of duty as a supply ship to the small craft and monitors of the Mobile Riverine Force. That service lasted until December 1967 when she voyaged to Guam for an overhaul. The repairs lasted until 3 March 1968. On the 4th, the tank landing ship got underway for Japan. By 19 April she was back in Vietnam supplying American bases in the Mekong Delta. Blanco County continued to serve in Vietnam for over a year. She alternated tours of duty on "Operation Market Time" and base resupply missions with periods of upkeep at Subic Bay and Guam as well as rest and relaxation visits to numerous Far Eastern ports.

=== Decommissioning and sale, 1969–1975 ===
She returned to the United States during the summer of 1969 to begin preparations for inactivation. Decommissioned on 3 October 1969 the tank landing ship was berthed at Orange, Texas. Her name was struck from the Naval Vessel Register on 15 September 1974; and she was sold to W. L. Weeks in July 1975, apparently for scrapping.

Blanco County earned three battle stars during World War II as LST-344, and the Navy Unit Commendation and five battle stars for service during the Vietnam War as Blanco County (LST-344).

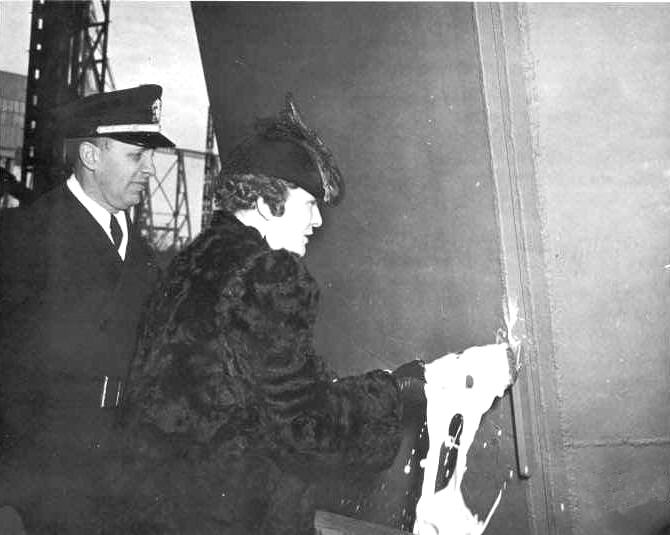
LST-344 launching, 15 December 1942. Mrs. Bonnie Ward, Wife of H.H. Ward, Master Machinist, Inside Machine Shop Master, christens the ship at Norfolk Navy Yard, Portsmouth, Virginia with Lieutenant R. I. Coleman, Aide to the Commandant, also on the platform.

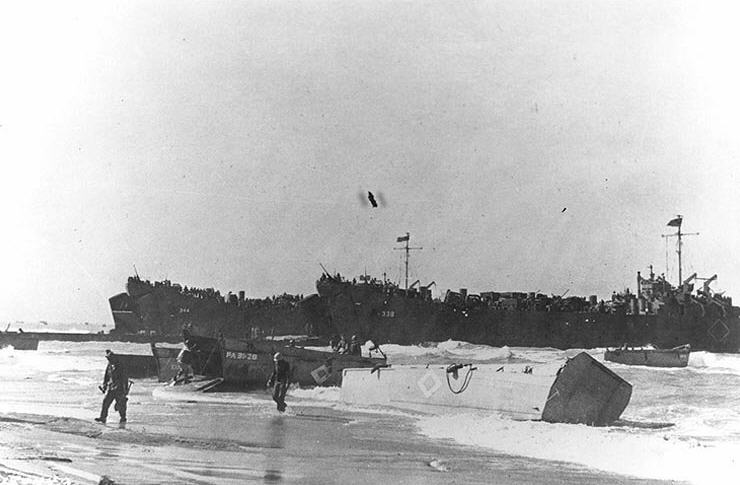
LST-344, (left) and LST-338 (right) unloading troops and supplies on the Gela invasion beaches in Sicily on "D-Day" 10 July 1943. Broached LCVP at right is from the Barnett (APA-5); the next LCVP to the left is from the Monrovia (APA-31).

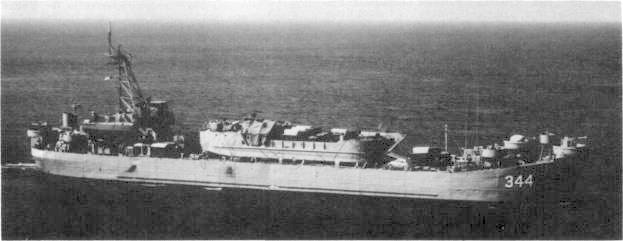
USS Blanco County (LST-344) underway off Guam in the 1960s with Army LCU-1517 land vehicles loaded on her main deck.

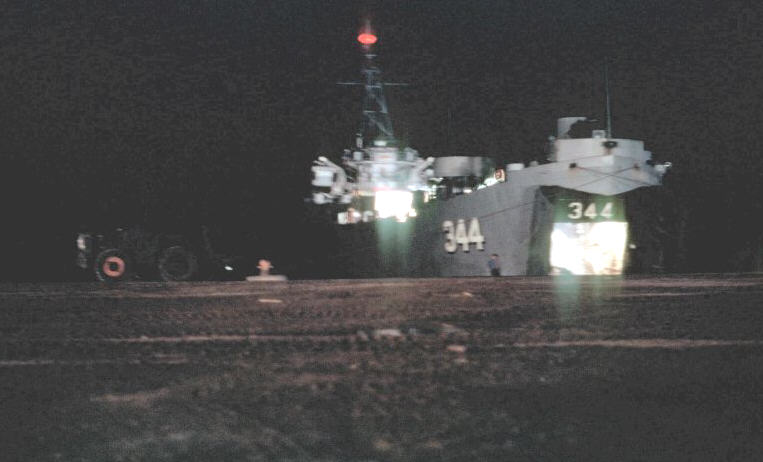
USS Blanco County (LST-344) unloading at night in October, 1968 at the Port of Cua Viet, I Corps Tactical Zone, South Vietnam.

== See also ==
- List of United States Navy LSTs
