= Pedernales Falls State Park =

State park in Texas, United States

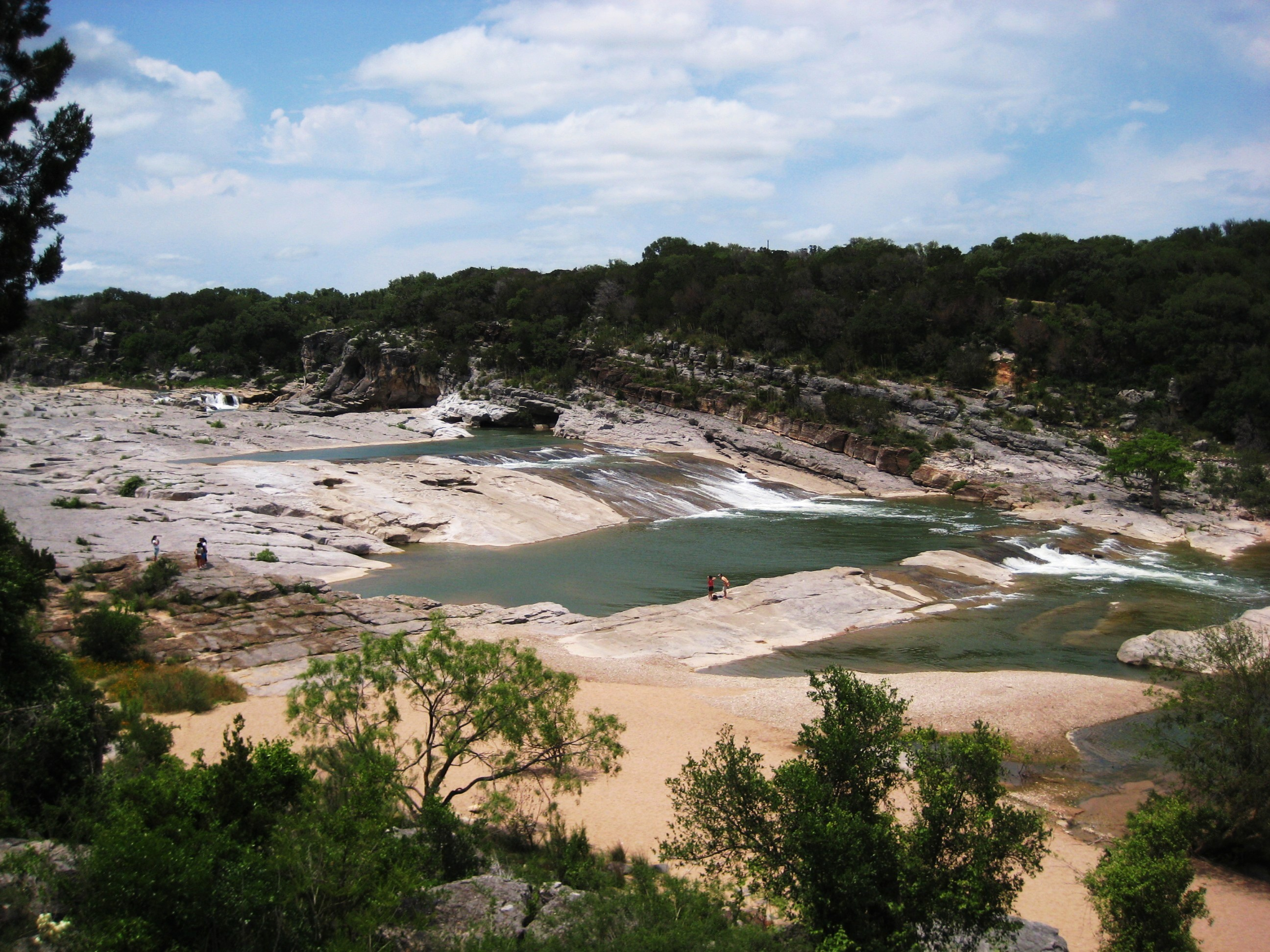
- Pedernales River running over limestone.
- Location: Blanco County, Texas
- Nearest city: Johnson City
- Coordinates: 30°18′0″N 98°14′30″W
- Area: 5,211.7 acres (2,109 ha)
- Established: 1970
- Visitors: 202,346 (in 2025)
- Governing body: Texas Parks and Wildlife Department
- Website: Official site

Pedernales Falls State Park (/ˌpɜːrdəˈnælɪs/ PUR-də-NAL-iss) is a 5,211.7 acres (2,109 ha) state park situated along the banks of the Pedernales River in Blanco County, Texas, United States. The park is located 10 miles (16 km) east of Johnson City, and about 25 miles west of Austin. The park opened in 1971 and is managed by the Texas Parks and Wildlife Department.

== History ==
Prior to the year 1970, the area that the park occupies was a working ranch, known as the Circle Bar Ranch. The state of Texas purchased the ranch in 1970 and opened the park in 1971.

== Recreation ==
Many of the recreational activities in Pedernales Falls State Park center around the Pedernales River: swimming, tubing and fishing. The park also has a number of picnic areas and campsites, including some primitive campsites that require a hike of over two miles to reach. There are also 19.8 miles (31.9 km) of hiking and mountain biking trails, 10 miles of equestrian trails, and 14 miles of backpacking trails. There is a small park store at the center.

Like many rivers in central Texas, the Pedernales is prone to variable water levels. A sign at the park shows a relatively tranquil river in one picture and a raging wall of muddy water in the next picture, said to be taken only five minutes after the first. The speed at which flash floods can arise along this river has resulted in several deaths at the park.

== Nature ==
The river limestone at Pedernales Falls is 300 million years old. Erosion from deposits in the Cretaceous period created the current formations.

=== Animals ===
Wildlife in the park is typical of the Texas Hill Country, including white-tailed deer, coyote, eastern cottontail, Mexican long-nosed armadillo, wild boar, Virginia opossum and common raccoon. Many types of birds, including the endangered golden-cheeked warbler, can be found in the summer.

Venomous northern cottonmouth are often observed in the river and creeks as are the non-venomous plain-bellied watersnake and diamondback watersnake. Other venomous snakes most commonly found in the Texas Hill Country, the western diamondback rattlesnake, eastern copperhead, and Texas coralsnake are rarely spotted.

=== Plants ===
Trees commonly found in the park include Texas live oak, Buckley's oak, Ashe juniper, pecan, American sycamore, cedar elm, little walnut, baldcypress, Texas ash and others.

== Weather ==
Climate data for Pedernales Falls State Park
Month	Jan	Feb	Mar	Apr	May	Jun	Jul	Aug	Sep	Oct	Nov	Dec	Year
Record high °F (°C)	89 (32)	100 (38)	102 (39)	101 (38)	102 (39)	110 (43)	108 (42)	107 (42)	110 (43)	98 (37)	93 (34)	89 (32)	110 (43)
Mean daily maximum °F (°C)	61 (16)	63.7 (17.6)	71.2 (21.8)	79.2 (26.2)	85.2 (29.6)	91.2 (32.9)	94.8 (34.9)	94.8 (34.9)	88.8 (31.6)	80.3 (26.8)	70.7 (21.5)	62.5 (16.9)	78.6 (25.9)
Mean daily minimum °F (°C)	34.8 (1.6)	38 (3)	46.1 (7.8)	53.9 (12.2)	62.4 (16.9)	68.7 (20.4)	70.9 (21.6)	70.1 (21.2)	64.3 (17.9)	54.3 (12.4)	45 (7)	36.2 (2.3)	53.7 (12.1)
Record low °F (°C)	7 (−14)	3 (−16)	13 (−11)	27 (−3)	36 (2)	50 (10)	56 (13)	53 (12)	37 (3)	22 (−6)	17 (−8)	1 (−17)	1 (−17)
Average precipitation inches (mm)	2.1 (53)	2.2 (56)	2.7 (69)	2.3 (58)	4 (100)	4 (100)	2.4 (61)	2 (51)	3.3 (84)	3.9 (99)	3.1 (79)	2 (51)	34 (860)
Average precipitation days	3	3	3.7	5.6	6.5	5.3	4.7	4.1	5	4.2	2.9	3.1	51.1
Average relative humidity (%)	67	65	58	61	65	62	59	59	64	66	65	63	63
Source: Weatherbase

== See also ==
- Balcones Canyonlands NWR
- Barton Creek
- Central Texas
- Colorado River (Texas)
- Double Mountain Fork Brazos River
- Edwards Plateau
- Enchanted Rock
- List of Texas state parks
- Llano River
- Mount Bonnell
- Texas Hill Country
