= Pedernales River =

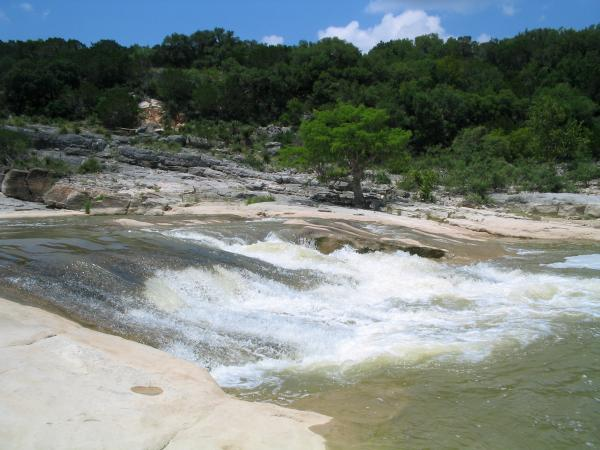
- The Pedernales River in Pedernales Falls State Park
- Location of Pedernales River, Texas

Location
- Country: United States
- State: Texas
- Region: Edwards Plateau, Texas Hill Country

Physical characteristics
- Source: Kerr County, Texas
  - coordinates: 30°15′45″N 99°19′31″W
  - elevation: 690 m (2,260 ft)
- Mouth: Lake Travis, Travis County, Texas
  - coordinates: 30°25′51″N 98°03′36″W
  - elevation: 197 m (646 ft)
- Length: 170 km (110 mi)
- Basin size: 3,297 km^{2} (1,273 sq mi)
- Discharge
  - average: 2.3 m^{3}/s (81 cu ft/s)

The Pedernales River (/ˌpɜːrdəˈnælɪs/ PUR-də-NAL-iss) is a tributary of the Colorado River, about 106 miles (171 km) long, in Central Texas in the United States. It drains an area of the Edwards Plateau, flowing west to east across the Texas Hill Country west of Austin. The name "Pedernales", first used in the middle 18th century, comes from a Spanish word for the flint rocks characteristic of the riverbed.

== Description ==
The river rises from springs in northeastern Kerr County, roughly 25 miles (40 km) southeast of Junction. It flows north into southeast Kimble County and then east into Gillespie County, passing south of Fredericksburg, and into Blanco County, passing north of Johnson City. It joins the Colorado from the southwest in Lake Travis, around 10 miles (16 km) west of Austin.

The river has a close association with the Texas Hill Country, tied to the history of the region and emblematic of its geography. Along its route, it flows over numerous rugged limestone escarpments as it winds eastward, passing along the south side of the ranch of President Lyndon B. Johnson, who grew up in nearby Stonewall, south of the river.

In 1750, Fray Benito Fernández de Santa Ana proposed a plan to the Spanish government that a mission be established among the Lipan Apache who lived along the river. In 1789, the river was the site of a skirmish between Colonel Francisco Xavier Ugalde and a group of Lipan and Mescalero Indians. The first permanent white settlement along the river was in 1846, when the town of Fredericksburg was established by German immigrants. The threat of raids from Apaches restricted settlement in the area until the 1880s.

Pedernales Falls State Park is located along the river in Blanco County east of Johnson City. Like many rivers in Central Texas, it is prone to variable water levels. A sign at the state park shows a relatively tranquil river in one picture and a raging wall of muddy water in the next picture, said to be taken only five minutes after the first. The speed at which flash floods can arise along this river has resulted in several deaths at the park, and warning sirens have been installed in the park and elsewhere along the river. The lower river is a popular destination for whitewater rafting during the high-water season.

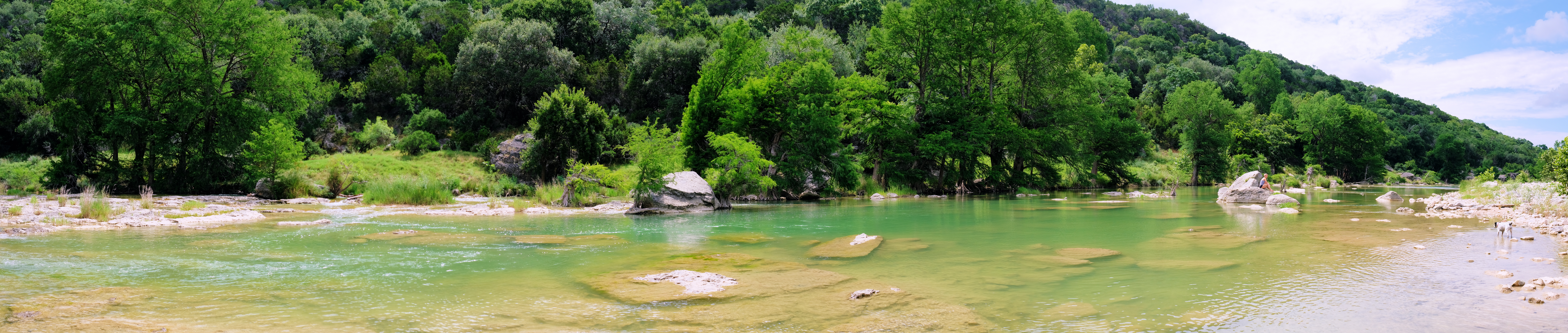
Pedernales River in Pedernales Falls State Park

== See also ==
- List of Texas rivers
- Llano River
- Frio River
- Brazos River
- White River (Texas)
- Pecos River
- Rio Grande
