= Blanco River (Texas) =

River in Blanco, Hays and Kendall counties in Texas, United States

Blanco River Río Blanco
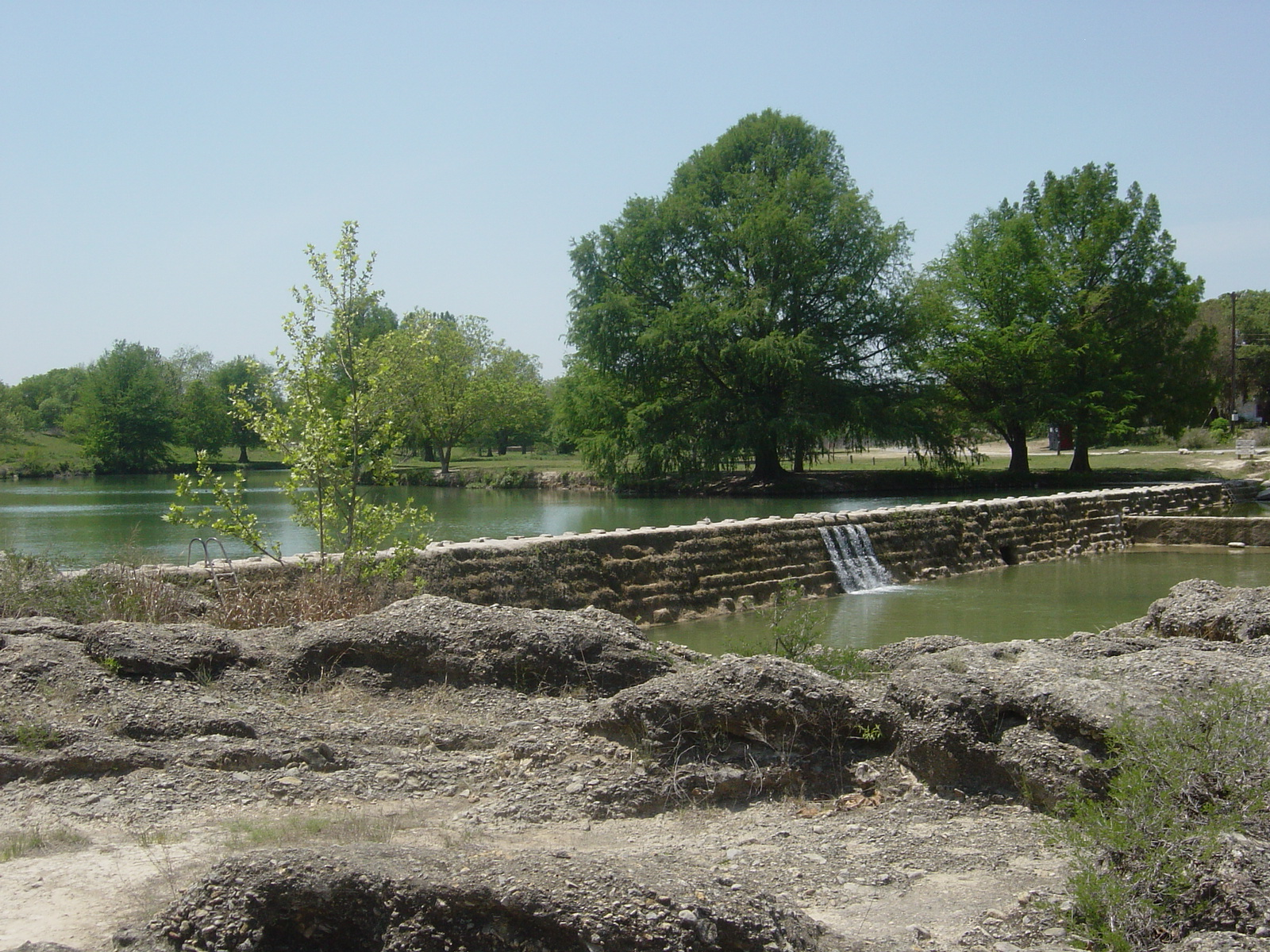
- The Blanco River near Blanco, Texas.

Location
- Country: U.S.

Physical characteristics
- Source
  - location: Kendall County, Texas, U.S.
  - elevation: 1,607 feet (490 m)
- Mouth: 29.85988°N 97.91367°W
  - location: San Marcos River, Hays County, Texas, U.S.
- Length: 87 miles (140 km)
- Basin size: 412 square miles (1,067 km^{2})
- Discharge
  - average: 93 cu ft/s (3 m^{3}/s)

The Blanco River is a river in the Hill Country of Texas, United States.

== Course ==
The primary source for the river is a series of springs in northern Kendall County. The river flows generally eastward for 87 miles (140 km) through Kendall County, Blanco County and Hays County. Near San Marcos, it takes a southerly turn and joins with the San Marcos River.

The river is generally quite shallow, and it briefly dips below ground in some areas in the Hill Country. As with many of the rivers in the Texas Hill Country, there is great variability in the Blanco River's flow. The mean flow is 93 ft^{3}/s (3 m^{3}/s), but heavy rains in the river's watershed can cause flash flooding with little warning.

== 2015 flooding ==
In 1998, the Blanco River had peak flooding discharge of 2,970 cubic metres per second (105,000 cu ft/s) from a 1,067 square kilometres (412 sq mi) basin.

Early in the morning on May 24, during the 2015 Texas–Oklahoma floods, the Blanco River experienced catastrophic flooding. The river at Wimberley rose more than 30 feet in less than three hours, setting a new record high crest of more than 40 feet while disabling the gauge.

Rainfall totals of 10 to 13 inches were reported upstream in southern Blanco County, and all of this water entered the Blanco River and Little Blanco River. The Fischer Store Road bridge over the Blanco River west of Wimberley was destroyed by flood waters. The Blanco River, downstream from the bridge, at Wimberley reached a record crest. The gauge failed at 40 feet and the USGS later estimated the crest at 44.9 feet with peak flow of 175,000 cubic feet per second (5,000 m^{3}/s). This height was more than 10 feet over the previous record height of 33.3 feet from 1929. Homes along the banks of the Blanco River from the City of Blanco, through Wimberley, and down to San Marcos experienced an historic flood. Many homes were totally destroyed and swept down stream. Many homes were struck by large debris, including full size cypress trees, which typically lined the banks of the river. A house in the 100 block of Deer Crossing Lane in Wimberley was washed away in the flood with nine people inside; one person survived while eight others died. Six bodies were recovered and the two small children remain missing. Several of the bodies were recovered near San Marcos, Texas nearly 30 miles downstream. Ten fatalities were reported for this flooding event. The river experienced rises that exceeded 20 feet in one hour. Insured losses were estimated at $100 million. Overall in Hays County, including Wimberley and San Marcos, 321 homes were destroyed, with hundreds more heavily damaged.

During the May 24 event, the river crested at 36.52 ft at Kyle, Texas, which was (at the time) the highest the river had been since a 40.0 ft crest in 1929. Kyle is downstream of the Wimberley gauge. On October 30, 2015, the river flooded again. The river crested at 37.24 ft at Kyle, exceeding the gauge height of the May 24, 2015 crest, becoming the highest the river had been since a 40.0 ft crest in 1929.

The Wimberley gauge had a crest of 26.54 ft on October 30, 2015. Flooding near San Marcos led to closure of the Interstate 35 bridge over the Blanco River for the second time in 2015.

== Geography ==
The upper reaches of the Blanco River are hilly, and the river's slopes are frequently steep. As the river reaches the Balcones Escarpment near San Marcos, it widens and its slopes moderate; this is typical of rivers in the central part of the state.

== Economy ==
The Blanco River provides drinking water for the city of Blanco, as well as water supplies for nearby ranches. The river also supports a number of recreational areas, including the Blanco State Recreation Area in Blanco, the former Boy Scouts camp El Rancho Cima near Wimberley, and other private parks and resorts.

== See also ==
- List of rivers of Texas
- Guadalupe River (Texas)
- Guadalupe-Blanco River Authority
