= Blanco County Courthouse (Texas) =

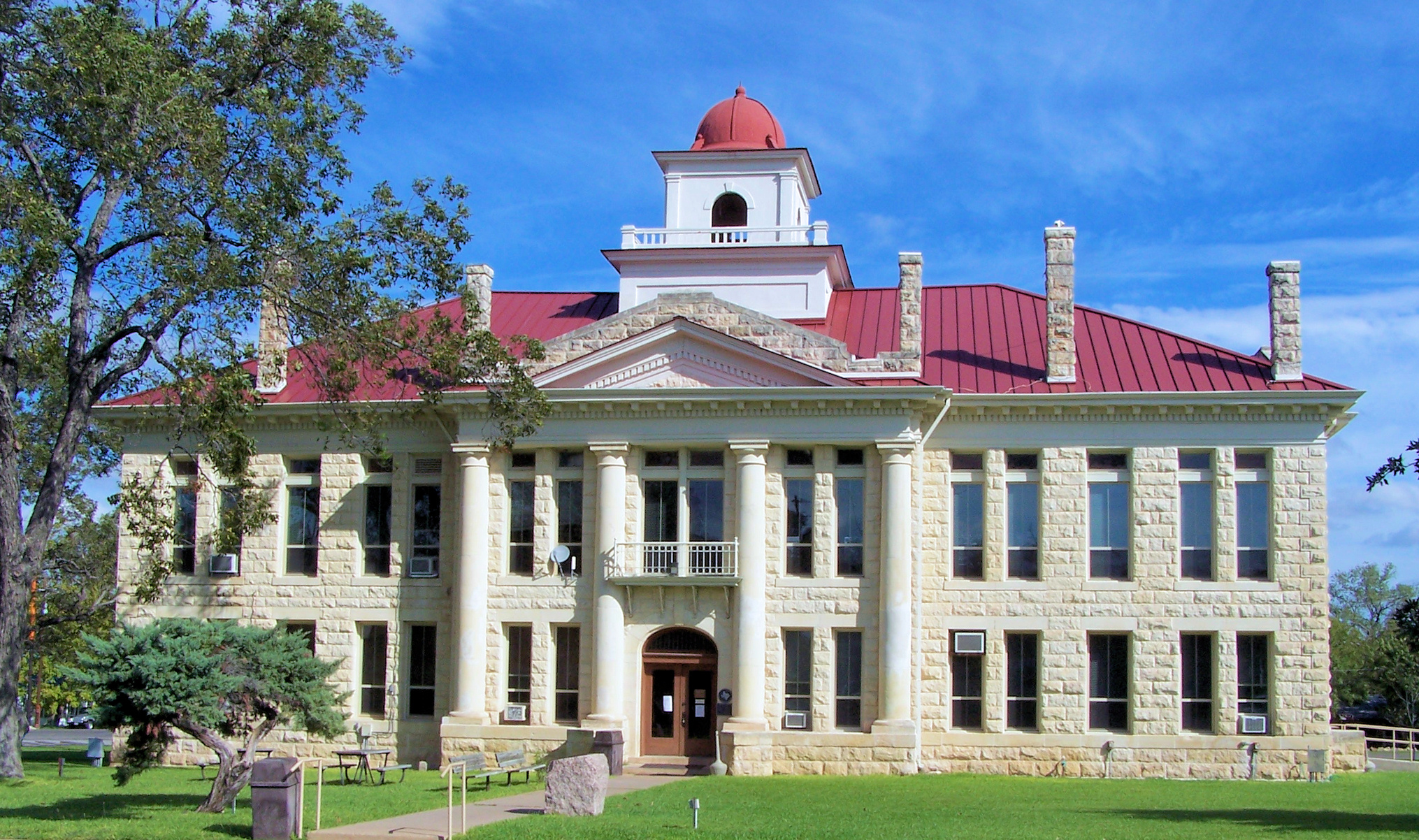
- Blanco County Courthouse

- Location within Texas Location within the United States
- 30°16′41″N 98°24′41″W
- Location: Johnson City, Texas

History
- Built: 1916

Site notes
- Architect: Henry T. Phelps
- Architectural style: Second Empire

Recorded Texas Historic Landmark
- Designated: 1983
- Reference no.

Blanco County Courthouse is a county courthouse located in Johnson City, Texas. It was designed by architect Henry T. Phelps in the Second Empire style, and completed in 1916.

The building replaced the earlier 19th-century Old Blanco County Courthouse.

The courthouse was designated a Recorded Texas Historic Landmark in 1983.

== See also ==
- Old Blanco County Courthouse
- Recorded Texas Historic Landmarks in Blanco County
