= Johnson City Independent School District =

School district in Texas, United States

Address
- 304 North LBJ Drive Johnson City, Texas; United States

District information
- Grades: PK–12
- Schools: 3
- NCES District ID: 4824840

Students and staff
- Students: 718 (2023–2024)
- Teachers: 63.23
- Student–teacher ratio: 11.36:1

Other information
- Website: www.jc.txed.net

Johnson City Independent School District is a public school district based in Johnson City, Texas (USA).

Located in Blanco County, small portions of the district extend into Hays, Llano and Travis counties.

In 2009, the school district was rated "academically acceptable" by the Texas Education Agency.

== Schools ==
- Lyndon B. Johnson High School (Grades 9‍–‍12)

During 2022‍–‍2023, Johnson High School had an enrollment of 247 students in grades 9‍–‍12 and a student to teacher ratio of 10.37. The school received an overall rating of "A" from the Texas Education Agency for the 2021‍–‍2022 school year.

- Lyndon B. Johnson Middle School (Grades 6‍–‍8)

During 2022‍–‍2023, Johnson Middle School had an enrollment of 171 students in grades 6‍–‍8 and a student to teacher ratio of 13.62. The school received an overall rating of "B" from the Texas Education Agency for the 2021‍–‍2022 school year.

- Lyndon B. Johnson Elementary School (Grades PK‍–‍5)

During 2022‍–‍2023, Johnson Elementary School had an enrollment of 304 students in grades PK‍–‍5 and a student to teacher ratio of 12.55. The school received an overall rating of "B" from the Texas Education Agency for the 2021‍–‍2022 school year.

== Notable alumni ==
Notable alumni of the Johnson City schools include:

- Lyndon B. Johnson, 36th President of the United States
- Jesse Sublett, author and musician
- Sedrick Shaw, former Iowa Hawkeyes and NFL running back
- Rita Benson LeBlanc, former heir-apparent of the New Orleans Saints
