= Johnson City, Texas =

- City
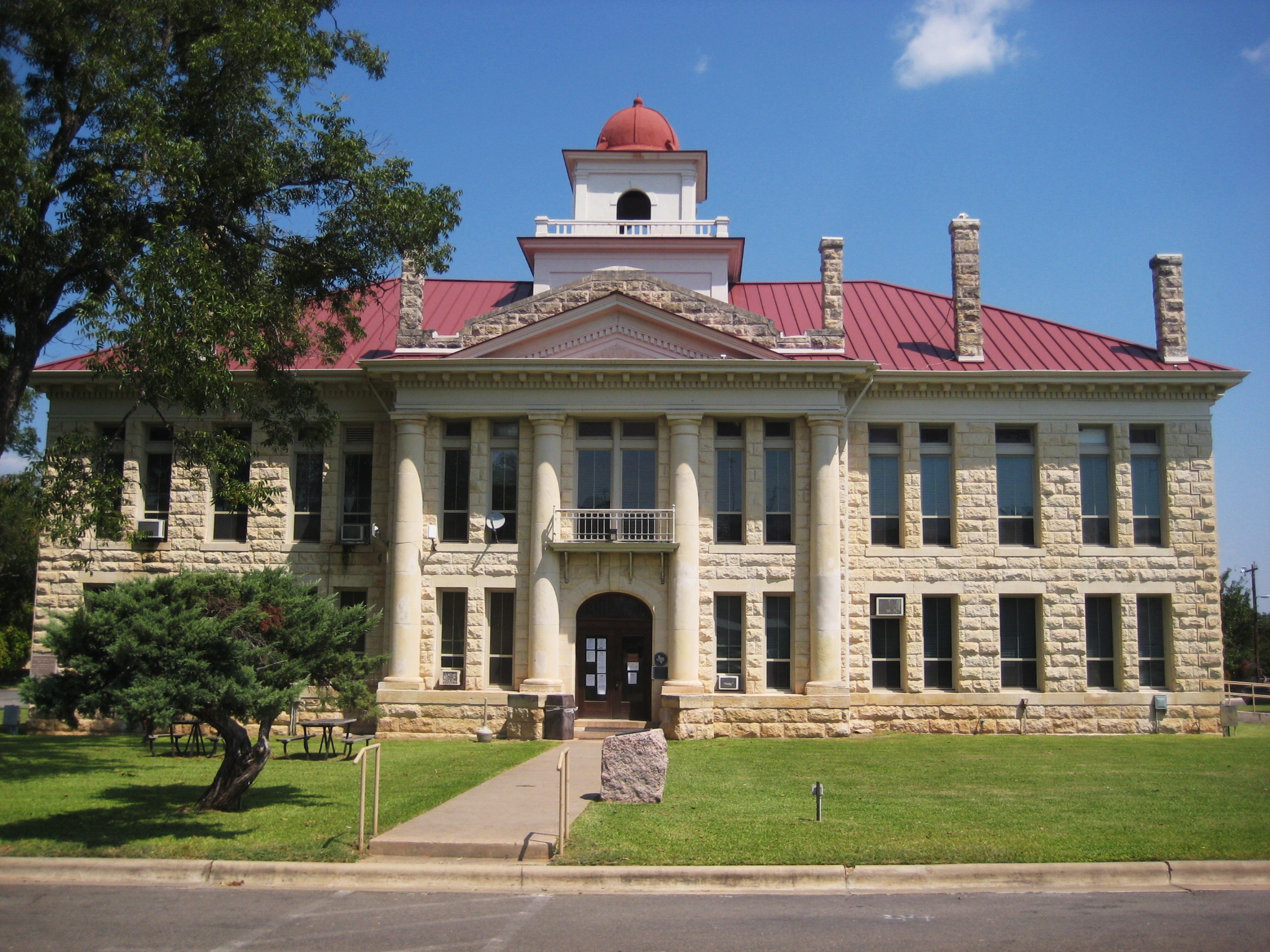
- Blanco County Courthouse
- Motto: "The Crossroads Of The Texas Hill Country"
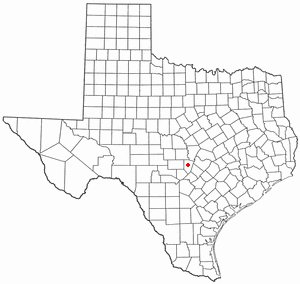
- Location of Johnson City, Texas

- Coordinates: 30°16′27″N 98°24′22″W
- Country: United States
- State: Texas
- County: Blanco
- Founder: James P. Johnson
- Named for: Sam E. Johnson, Sr.

Area
  - Total: 1.81 sq mi (4.69 km^{2})
  - Land: 1.81 sq mi (4.68 km^{2})
  - Water: 0.0039 sq mi (0.01 km^{2})
- Elevation: 1,221 ft (372 m)

Population (2020)
  - Total: 1,627
  - Density: 900.9/sq mi (347.83/km^{2})
- Time zone: UTC−6 (Central (CST))
  - Summer (DST): UTC−5 (CDT)
- ZIP Code: 78636
- Area code: 830
- FIPS code: 48-37780
- GNIS feature ID: 2410146
- Website: www.johnsoncitytx.org

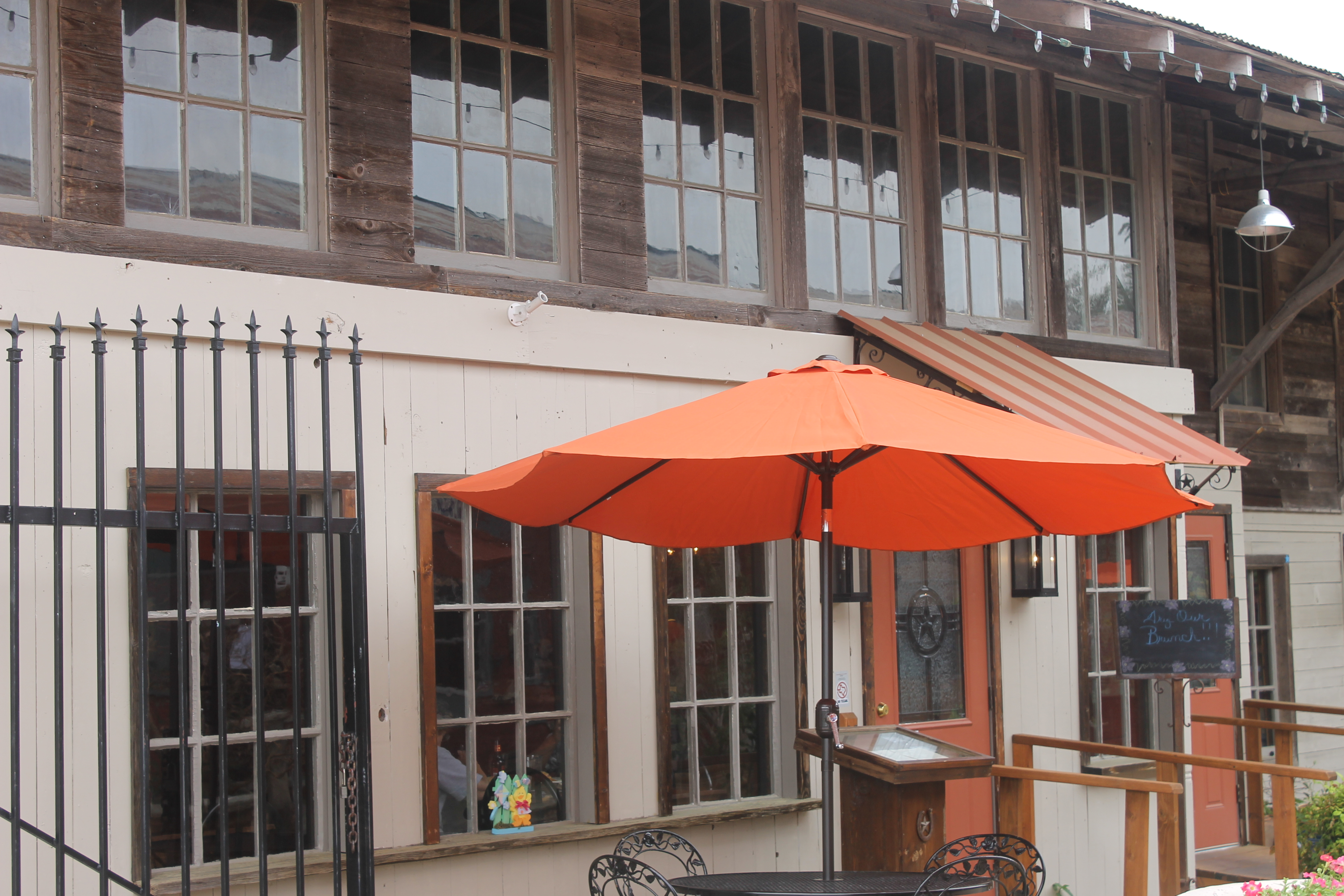
East Main Grill Restaurant in Johnson City

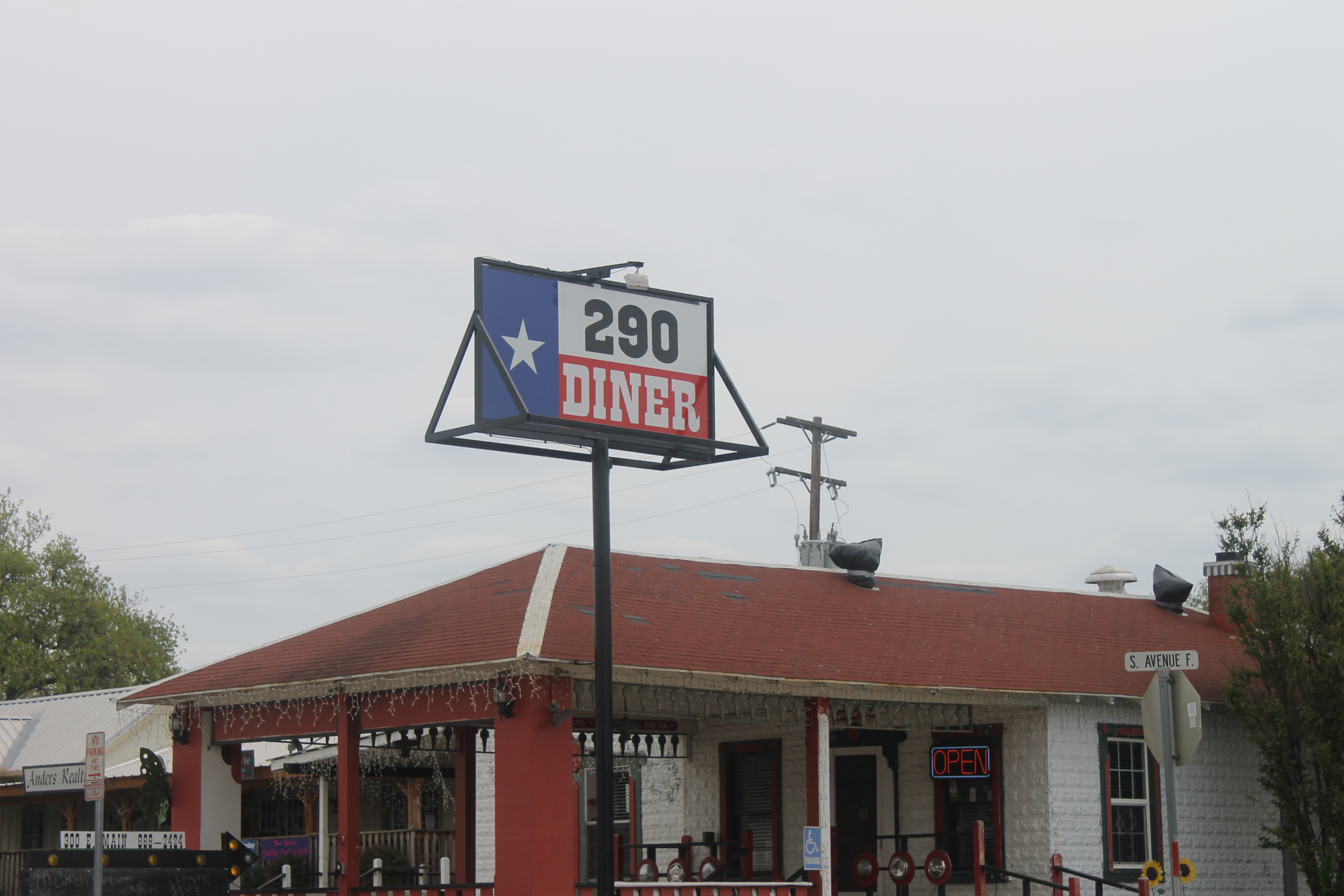
290 Diner along U.S. Route 290 in Johnson City

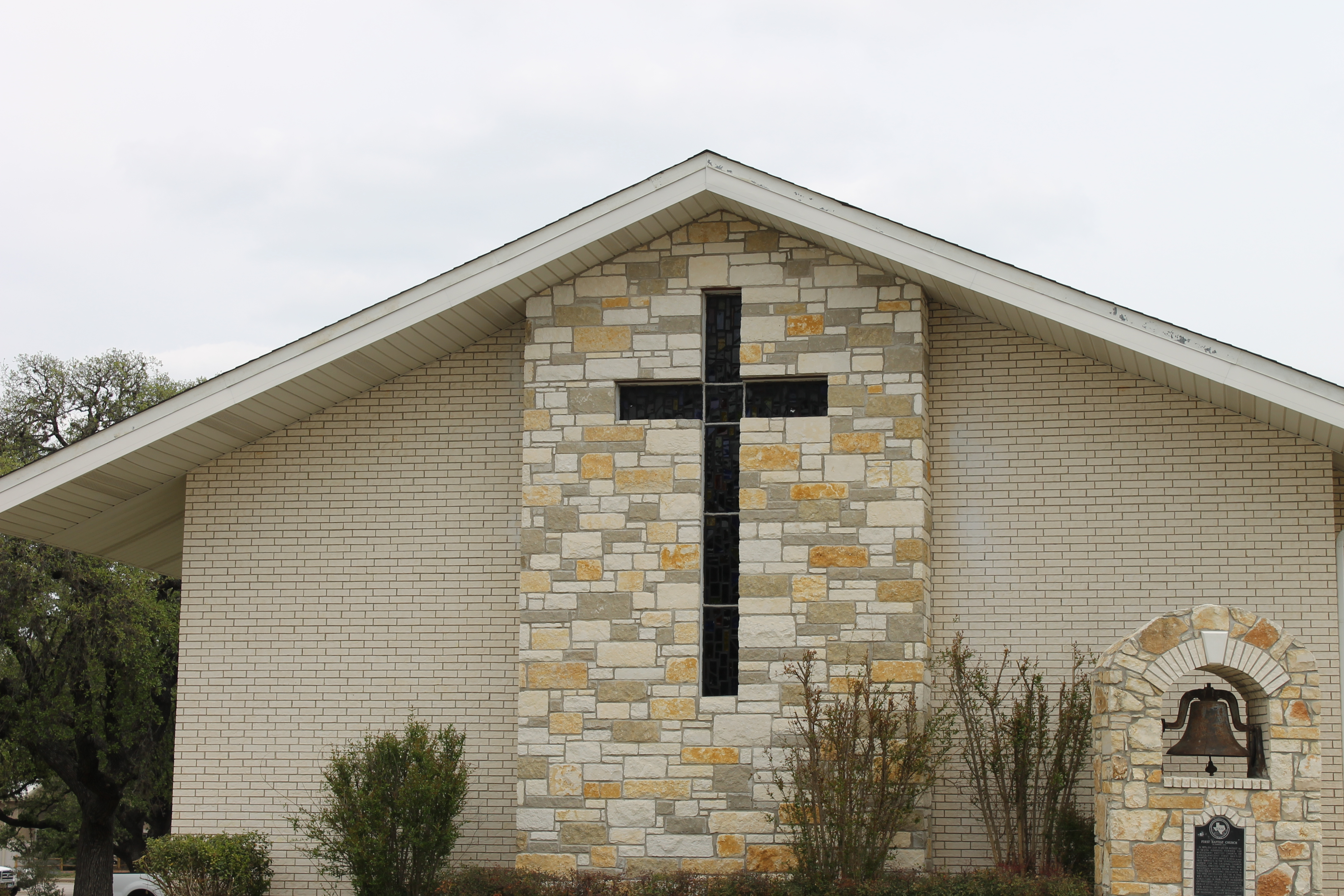
First Baptist Church of Johnson City

Johnson City is a city in and the county seat of Blanco County, Texas, United States. Its population was 1,627 at the 2020 census. Founded in 1879, it was named for early settler James Polk Johnson, nephew of Sam E. Johnson, Sr., and uncle of US President Lyndon B. Johnson. Johnson City is part of the Texas-German belt region.

== History ==
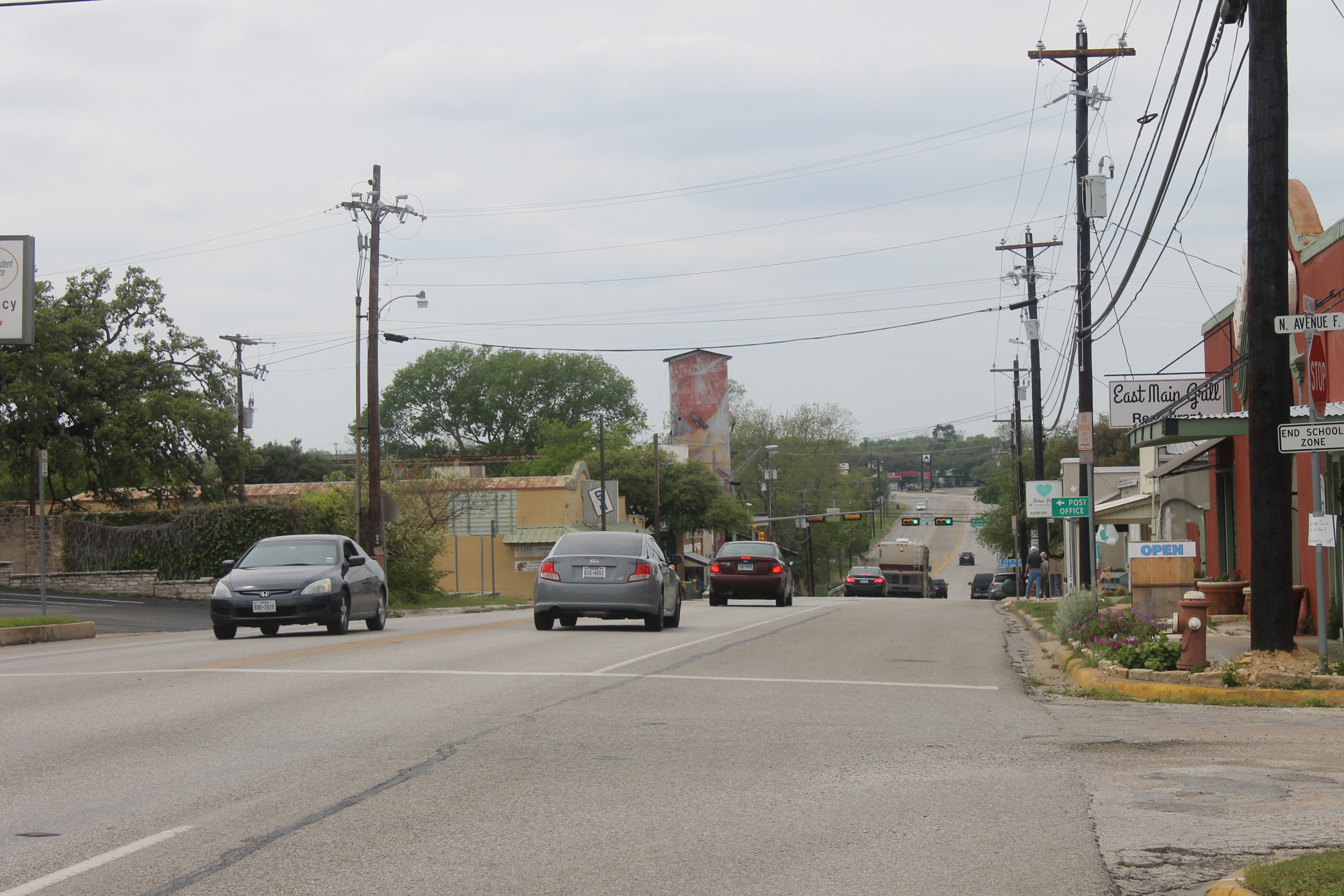
A glimpse of downtown Johnson City

Johnson City was founded by James P. Johnson, who donated a 320-acre (130 ha) site on the Pedernales River for the founding of the town in 1879. It was the hometown of Lyndon B. Johnson, 36th president of the United States. The county seat of Blanco County was moved to Johnson City in 1890.

== Geography ==
Johnson City is located in central Blanco County about 1 mile (2 km) south of the Pedernales River. U.S. Routes 281 and 290 join near the center of town; U.S. 281 leads north 23 miles (37 km) to Marble Falls, and U.S. 290 leads west 30 miles (48 km) to Fredericksburg. The two highways run south out of town together; U.S. 290 soon turns east and leads 47 miles (76 km) to Austin, while U.S. 281 continues south 64 miles (103 km) to San Antonio.

According to the United States Census Bureau, Johnson City has a total area of 1.8 square miles (4.7 km^{2}), all land.

=== Climate ===
Johnson City experiences a humid subtropical climate (Köppen Cfa), with hot summers and a generally comfortable winter. Daily average temperatures range from 82 °F or 27.8 °C in the summer to 47 °F or 8.3 °C during winter.

Climate data for Johnson City, Texas (2 miles north) (1991–2020 normals, extremes 1964–2025)
Month	Jan	Feb	Mar	Apr	May	Jun	Jul	Aug	Sep	Oct	Nov	Dec	Year
Record high °F (°C)	89 (32)	100 (38)	102 (39)	101 (38)	104 (40)	110 (43)	110 (43)	110 (43)	110 (43)	98 (37)	93 (34)	89 (32)	110 (43)
Mean maximum °F (°C)	78.8 (26.0)	83.1 (28.4)	86.8 (30.4)	91.1 (32.8)	95.4 (35.2)	98.4 (36.9)	100.8 (38.2)	101.8 (38.8)	98.1 (36.7)	92.0 (33.3)	84.7 (29.3)	79.9 (26.6)	103.1 (39.5)
Mean daily maximum °F (°C)	62.3 (16.8)	65.8 (18.8)	72.9 (22.7)	79.9 (26.6)	86.1 (30.1)	92.4 (33.6)	95.5 (35.3)	96.6 (35.9)	90.2 (32.3)	81.8 (27.7)	71.2 (21.8)	63.9 (17.7)	79.9 (26.6)
Daily mean °F (°C)	48.7 (9.3)	52.2 (11.2)	59.8 (15.4)	66.5 (19.2)	74.5 (23.6)	80.8 (27.1)	83.4 (28.6)	83.7 (28.7)	77.3 (25.2)	68.1 (20.1)	58.1 (14.5)	50.5 (10.3)	67.0 (19.4)
Mean daily minimum °F (°C)	35.1 (1.7)	38.7 (3.7)	46.7 (8.2)	53.1 (11.7)	63.0 (17.2)	69.2 (20.7)	71.4 (21.9)	70.8 (21.6)	64.3 (17.9)	54.4 (12.4)	44.9 (7.2)	37.1 (2.8)	54.1 (12.3)
Mean minimum °F (°C)	19.9 (−6.7)	23.4 (−4.8)	26.3 (−3.2)	35.1 (1.7)	45.7 (7.6)	59.1 (15.1)	65.4 (18.6)	62.7 (17.1)	49.7 (9.8)	35.3 (1.8)	25.8 (−3.4)	20.8 (−6.2)	17.3 (−8.2)
Record low °F (°C)	7 (−14)	3 (−16)	13 (−11)	27 (−3)	36 (2)	50 (10)	55 (13)	50 (10)	37 (3)	22 (−6)	17 (−8)	1 (−17)	1 (−17)
Average precipitation inches (mm)	2.25 (57)	2.01 (51)	2.56 (65)	2.77 (70)	4.03 (102)	3.23 (82)	2.15 (55)	2.21 (56)	3.36 (85)	3.62 (92)	2.98 (76)	1.85 (47)	33.02 (839)
Average snowfall inches (cm)	0.1 (0.25)	0.1 (0.25)	0.0 (0.0)	0.0 (0.0)	0.0 (0.0)	0.0 (0.0)	0.0 (0.0)	0.0 (0.0)	0.0 (0.0)	0.0 (0.0)	0.0 (0.0)	0.0 (0.0)	0.2 (0.51)
Average precipitation days (≥ 0.01 in)	7.2	7.5	8.3	6.1	7.5	7.1	5.0	5.0	6.5	7.4	6.4	6.4	80.4
Average snowy days (≥ 0.1 in)	0.1	0.1	0.0	0.0	0.0	0.0	0.0	0.0	0.0	0.0	0.0	0.1	0.3
Source: NOAA

== Demographics ==
Historical population
Census	Pop.	Note	%±
1950	648		—
1960	611		−5.7%
1970	767		25.5%
1980	872		13.7%
1990	932		6.9%
2000	1,191		27.8%
2010	1,656		39.0%
2020	1,627		−1.8%
U.S. Decennial Census

=== 2020 census ===
As of the 2020 census, Johnson City had 1,627 people, 675 households, and 415 families residing in the city.

The median age was 44.9 years; 21.0% of residents were under 18 and 21.8% were 65 or older. For every 100 females, there were 83.6 males, and for every 100 females 18 and over, there were 81.2 males age 18 and over.

Of the 675 households, 30.1% had children under 18 living in them, 44.7% were married-couple households, 17.0% were households with a male householder and no spouse or partner present, and 34.8% were households with a female householder and no spouse or partner present. About 30.1% of all households were made up of individuals, and 18.0% had someone living alone who was 65 or older.

Of the 781 housing units, 13.6% were vacant. The homeowner vacancy rate was 3.6% and the rental vacancy rate was 5.5%.

None of residents lived in urban areas, while 100.0% lived in rural areas.

Racial composition as of the 2020 census
Race	Number	Percent
White	1,267	77.9%
Black or African American	7	0.4%
American Indian and Alaska Native	11	0.7%
Asian	13	0.8%
Native Hawaiian and other Pacific Islander	0	0.0%
Some other race	99	6.1%
Two or more races	230	14.1%
Hispanic or Latino (of any race)	359	22.1%

=== 2000 census ===
As of the 2000 census, 1,191 people, 442 households, and 317 families resided in the city. The population density was 891.7 inhabitants per square mile (344.3/km^{2}). The 490 housing units had an average density of 366.9 per square mile (141.7/km^{2}). The racial makeup of the city was 89.67% White, 0.84% Native American, 0.17% Asian, 8.23% from other races, and 1.09% from two or more races. Hispanics or Latinos of any race were 20.57% of the population.

Of the 442 households, 36.9% had children under 18 living with them, 56.6% were married couples living together, 11.3% had a female householder with no husband present, and 28.1% were not families. About 24.0% of all households were made up of individuals, and 12.7% had someone living alone who was 65 or older. The average household size was 2.57, and the average family size was 3.07.

In the city, the age distribution was 28.0% under 18, 6.5% from 18 to 24, 27.3% from 25 to 44, 21.2% from 45 to 64, and 17.1% who were 65 or older. The median age was 37 years. For every 100 females, there were 88.2 males. For every 100 females 18 and over, there were 84.5 males.

The median income in the city for a household was $34,148 and for a family was $39,375. Males had a median income of $30,529 versus $21,607 for females. The per capita income for the city was $14,977. About 9.2% of families and 12.5% of the population were below the poverty line, including 17.8% of those under 18 and 11.8% of those 65 or over.

== Parks and recreation ==
The Lyndon B. Johnson National Historical Park, operated by the National Park Service, is 12 miles (19 km) west of Johnson City. Pedernales Falls State Park is located 10 miles (16 km) east of Johnson City. Selah, Bamberger Ranch Preserve is a nearby wildlife sanctuary with a man-made batcave.

== Education ==
Johnson City is served by the Johnson City Independent School District, which has an elementary school, middle school, and high school. Students attend Lyndon B. Johnson High School.

== Media ==
=== Newspaper ===
The Johnson City Record Courier is a weekly newspaper published in Johnson City. It was established in 1883.

=== Radio ===
KFAN-FM/107.9 is licensed to serve Johnson City.

== Notable people ==
- Lyndon B. Johnson, 36th President of the United States
- Samuel Ealy Johnson Jr., politician and father of Lyndon Johnson
