= Bob McKay =

American football player (1947–2026)

No. 78, 66
- Positions: Tackle, Guard

Personal information
- Born: December 27, 1947; Seminole, Texas, U.S.
- Died: September 10, 2026 (aged 78)
- Listed height: 6 ft 5 in (1.96 m)
- Listed weight: 260 lb (118 kg)

Career information
- High school: Crane (Crane, Texas)
- College: Texas (1968-1969)
- NFL draft: 1970: 1st round, 21st overall pick

Career history
- Cleveland Browns (1970–1975); New England Patriots (1976–1978)

Awards and highlights
- National champion (1969); Consensus All-American (1969); First-team All-SWC (1969)

Career NFL statistics
- Games played: 105
- Games started: 71
- Fumble recoveries: 2
- Stats at Pro Football Reference
- College Football Hall of Fame

Robert Charles McKay (December 27, 1947 – September 10, 2026) was an American professional football player who was an offensive lineman in the National Football League (NFL) from 1970 through 1978 with the Cleveland Browns and New England Patriots. He played college football for the Texas Longhorns.

== College career ==
As a college player at the University of Texas at Austin, McKay earned consensus All-American honors during the 1969 season, helping lead the Longhorns to a perfect season and the national championship.

McKay was inducted into the University of Texas Hall of Honor in 1990 and the National Football Foundation College Football Hall of Fame in 2017. He was also selected for the Texas High School Football Hall of Fame in 2012.

== Professional career ==
McKay was selected 21st overall in first round of the 1970 NFL Draft by the Browns.

During an 1975 Browns home game against the rival Pittsburgh Steelers, defensive tackle "Mean" Joe Greene repeatedly kicked McKay in the groin. Greene was soon wrestled to the ground and punched by center Tom DeLeone and tight end Gary Parris, allowing McKay infamously to throw several haymakers on Greene before referees restored order.

== Death ==
McKay died on September 10, 2026, at the age of 78.
