= Charlie Geren =

Texas state legislator

Speaker pro tempore of the Texas House of Representatives
- In office February 8, 2023 – February 13, 2025
- Preceded by: Joe Moody
- Succeeded by: Joe Moody

Member of the Texas House of Representatives from the 99th district
- Incumbent
- Assumed office January 14, 2003
- Preceded by: Kenny Marchant

Member of the Texas House of Representatives from the 89th district
- In office January 9, 2001 – January 14, 2003
- Preceded by: Sue Palmer
- Succeeded by: Jodie Anne Laubenberg

Personal details
- Born: October 22, 1949 (age 77) Fort Worth, Texas, U.S.
- Party: Republican
- Children: 1
- Relatives: Preston Geren Jr. (father); Pete Geren (brother)
- Education: Southern Methodist University (BBA)
- Website: Office website Campaign website

Charles L. Geren (born October 22, 1949) is an American politician and member of the Texas House of Representatives. He represented District 89 from 2001 to 2003 before being redistricted into District 99. Both districts encompass a portion of Tarrant County.

== Political career ==
In the 2010 Republican primary in District 93, Geren defeated Matt Krause, 8,037 (57.6 percent) to 5,915 (42.4 percent).

In the general election in District 99 held on November 7, 2018, Geren with 37,944 votes (64.3 percent), defeated Democrat Michael Stackhouse, who trailed with 21,053 ballots (35.7 percent).

Geren, an ally of Joe Straus, the moderate Republican former Speaker of the Texas House of Representatives, faced unsuccessful Tea Party movement opposition in the Republican primary on March 1, 2016, from Bo French. Geren defeated French again in the March 6, 2018, Republican primary.

A 2017 article from Transparency USA described Geren as a "liberal Republican", while ananalysis by Mark P. Jones at Rice University charecterized Geren as "slightyly liberal".

During the 86th and 87th Legislature, Representative Joe Moody served as Speaker Pro tem of the state house, but he was removed from the position by Texas House Speaker Dade Phelan on July 15, 2021, after Moody and other Democrats broke quorum by leaving the state on July 12, 2021 in protest of Republican sponsored voting legislation. During the subsequent session, Speaker Phelan appointed Geren to the roll.

Geren has frequently served on the House Administration and Calendars committees which are responsible for the logistical opperation of the chamber.

Texas House of Representatives
| Preceded by Joe Moody | Speaker pro tempore of the Texas House of Representatives; 2021–2025 | Succeeded by Joe Moody |
