= William Carey Crane =

President of Baylor University from 1864 to 1885

The Reverend William Carey Crane
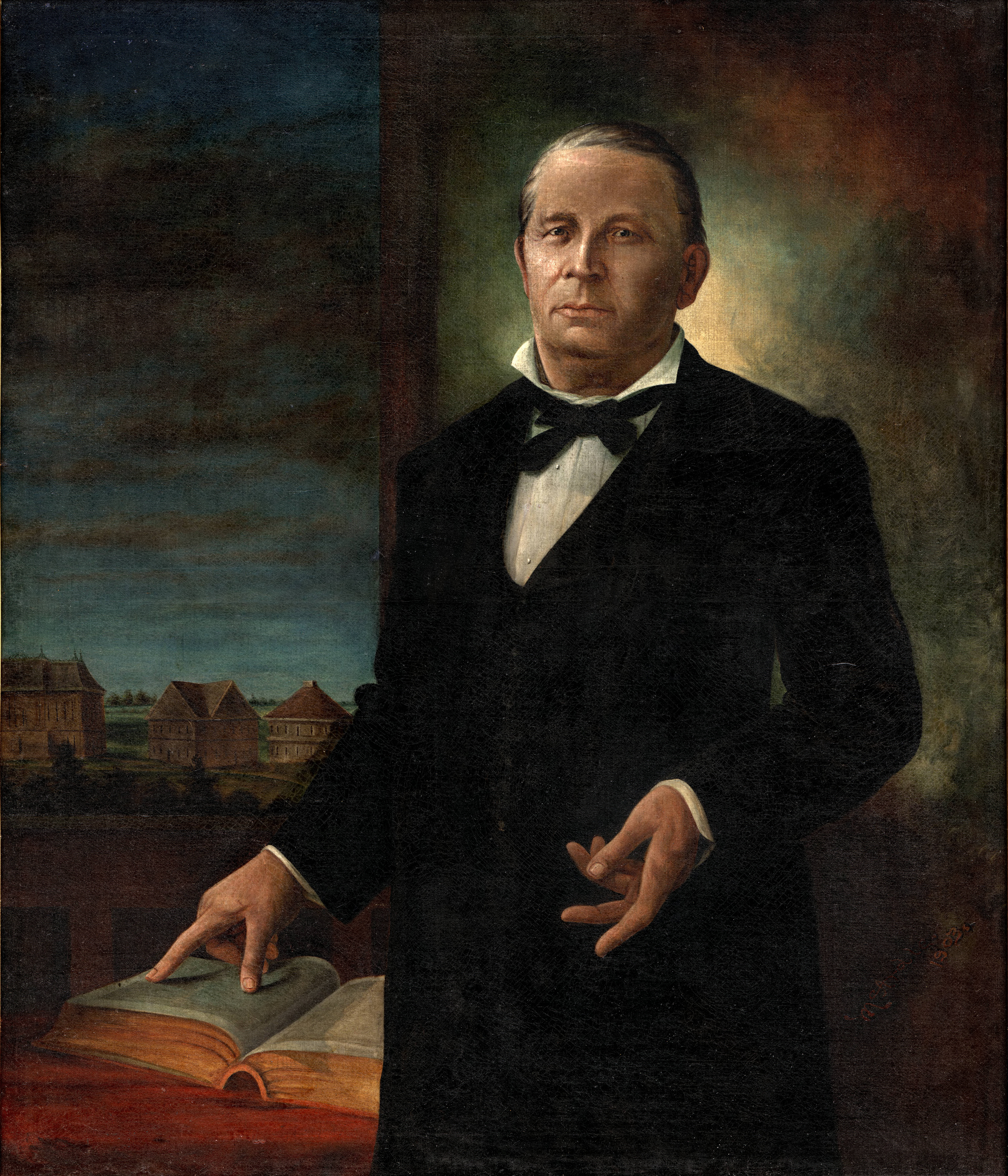
- Portrait by Henry Arthur McArdle, 1903.

President of Baylor University
- In office 1864–1885
- Preceded by: George Washington Baines
- Succeeded by: Reddin Andrews

Personal details
- Born: March 17, 1816 Richmond, Virginia
- Died: February 27, 1885 (aged 68) Independence, Texas
- Education: Columbian College

William Carey Crane (March 17, 1816 – February 27, 1885) was an American Baptist minister, an educator, and the president of Baylor University from 1864 to 1885.

== Early life and education ==
William Carey Crane was born in Richmond, Virginia, on March 17, 1816. He attended the Mount Pleasant Classical Institute in Amherst, Massachusetts, and Virginia Baptist Seminary, now known as Richmond College. In 1883, he attended the Hamilton Literary and Theological Institute and Madison, now known as Colgate University. In 1836, he received a B.A. from Columbian College, now known as George Washington University, followed by an M.A. in 1839.

== Career ==
From 1837 to 1839, Crane taught in Talbotton, Georgia, and preached in Thomaston and Greenville. He also preached at Mercer University. In 1838, he became a Baptist minister in Baltimore, Maryland. In 1839, he preached at the First Baptist Church in Montgomery, Alabama.

In the 1840s, he served as a pastor in Columbus, Vicksburg, and Yazoo City. In 1844, he was a professor at Union University in Murfreesboro, Tennessee, and he edited The Baptist with R. B. C. Howell for two years in Nashville. He served as president of Mississippi Female College in Hernando from 1851 to 1857, Semple Broaddus College in Centre Hill, Mississippi from 1859 to 1860, and Mount Lebanon College in Louisiana from 1860 to 1863. He was co-editor of the Louisiana Baptist and president of the Louisiana Baptist State Convention. He served as a pastor in Centre Hill, Coldwater, Oxford, Mississippi and New Connah, Tennessee. He was also an editor of the Mississippi Baptist. He was the cofounder and vice-president of the Mississippi State Historical Society. He served as the general agent of the American Tract Society for two years. From 1851 to 1863, he served as secretary of the Southern Baptist Convention and was its vice-president four times in the 1870s and 1880s.

In 1863, he served as pastor at the First Baptist Church in Houston, Texas. From 1864 to 1885, he was the president of Baylor University. He served as the pastor of the Independence Baptist Church for eighteen years from 1864 to 1867, and again from 1869 to 1884. He was also active in the Texas Baptist State Convention. He was the first president of the Texas State Teachers Association and chairman of the founding committee for Sam Houston Normal Institute, now known as Sam Houston State University. He was also a member of the American Philological Association.

=== Baylor presidency ===
In 1863, Baylor's trustees offered Crane the Baylor presidency with an annual salary of $3,000. During his tenure in office, he put considerable time into fundraising for Baylor, and also put his personal wealth, estimated at $7,000 to $10,000, into his attempts to strengthen the university and give it a permanent place in Independence. His attempts to garner financial support from Baptist organizations brought him into conflict with Rufus Burleson, then president of Waco University. This feud would last throughout Crane's term in office until his eventual death.

== Personal life ==
Crane was wed to three different women throughout his life. He married his first wife, Alcesta Flora Galusha, in 1838. After her death in 1840, he married Jane Louise Wright, who died in 1842. In 1845, he married Catharine Jane Shepherd.

Crane and Shepherd had nine children: six sons and three daughters. His son, Royston Campbell Crane of Sweetwater, was one of the original founders of the West Texas Historical Association and a mayor of Sweetwater, Texas.

== Legacy and death ==
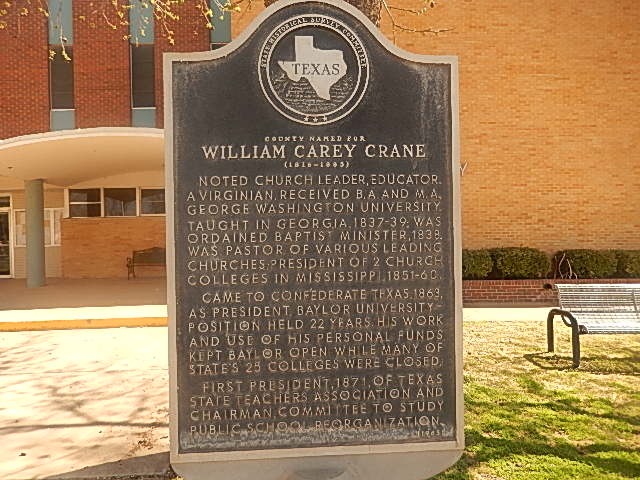
Crane historical marker in his namesake city and county, Crane, Texas

Crane died in office February 27, 1885. Crane County, Texas and Crane, Texas, are named for him.

The Baylor Institute of Faith and Learning maintains a Crane Scholars program.

== Bibliography ==
- Life and Select Literary Remains of Sam Houston of Texas (1884)
