= Family of Lyndon B. Johnson =

Family of the 36th President of the United States

- Coat of arms of Lyndon B. Johnson

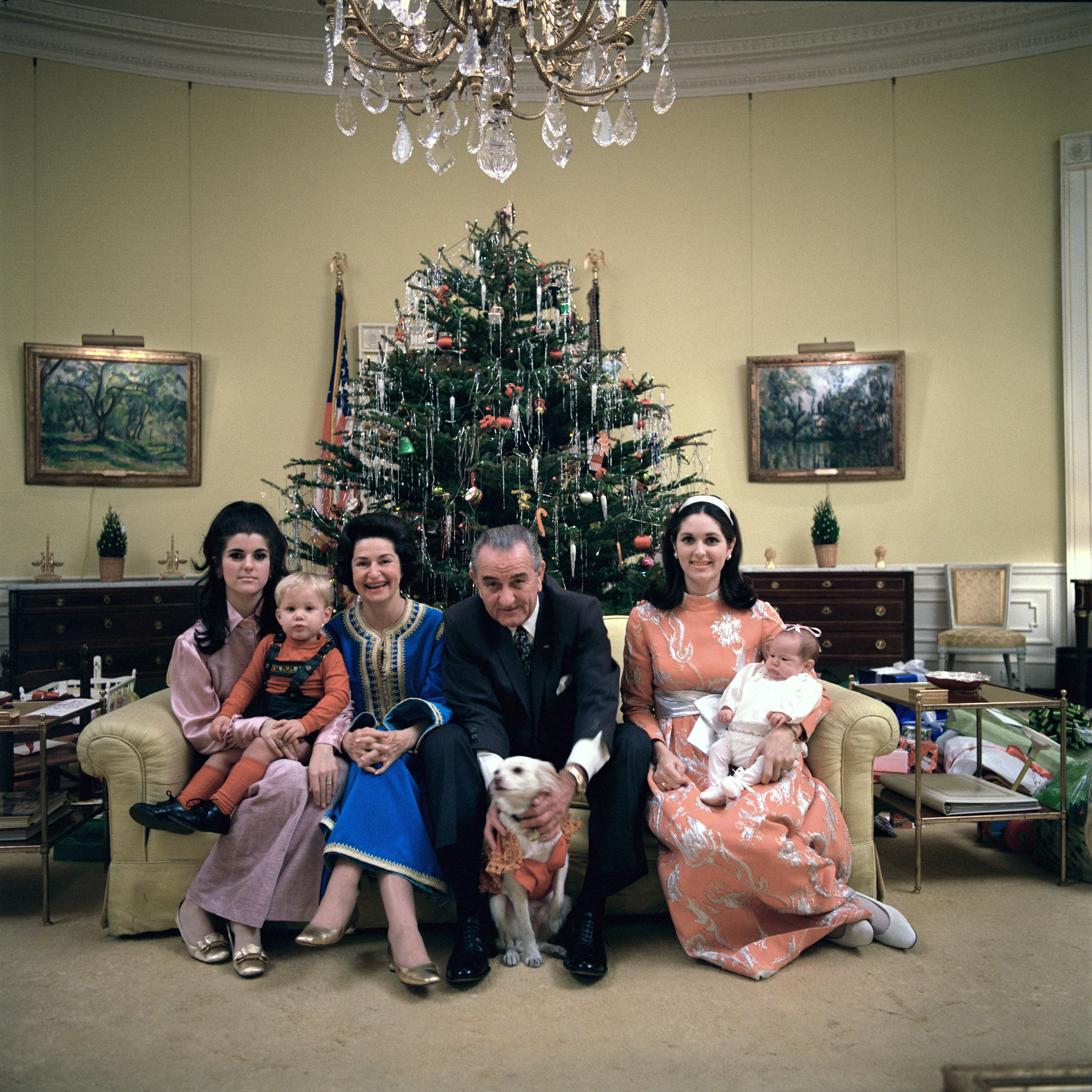
- Lyndon B. Johnson (center) with his family in the Yellow Oval Room, Christmas 1968
- Current region: Virginia/Texas, United States of America
- Origin: Alabama
- Titles: List: President of the United States; Vice President of the United States; U.S. Senator (Texas); Senate Majority Leader; Senate Minority Leader; First Lady of the United States; Second Lady of the United States; First Lady of Virginia; Second Lady of Virginia; Member of the U.S. House of Representatives (Texas); Member of the Texas House of Representatives (Texas)
- Members: Lyndon B. Johnson; Lady Bird Johnson; Lynda Bird Johnson Robb; Luci Baines Johnson; Lucinda Desha Robb; Catherine Lewis Robb; Jennifer Wickliffe Robb; Patrick Lyndon Nugent; Nicole Marie Nugent; Rebekah Johnson Nugent; Claudia Taylor Nugent
- Connected members: Chuck Robb; Ian J. Turpin; Hester family
- Estates: LBJ Ranch, Stonewall, Texas

The family of Lyndon B. Johnson is an American political family related to Lyndon B. Johnson, the 36th president of the United States (1963–1969), and his wife Lady Bird Johnson, the second lady of the United States (1961–1963) and the first lady of the United States (1963–1969). Their immediate family was the First Family of the United States from 1963 to 1969. They also served as the Second Family of the United States from 1961 to 1963, when Lyndon B. Johnson was vice president.

== Immediate family ==
The immediate family of Lyndon B, Johnson consists of his wife and their two daughters. The couple and their two daughters all shared the initials LBJ.

=== Lady Bird Johnson ===
Claudia Alta "Lady Bird" Johnson (née Taylor) was born on December 22, 1912, in Karnack, Texas, and died on July 11, 2007. She was an American socialite and first lady of the United States. She was married to Lyndon B. Johnson from 1934 until his death in 1973.

She was well-educated for a woman of her era and was a capable manager and a successful investor. As first lady, she was an advocate for beautifying the nation's cities and highways, and the Highway Beautification Act came to be informally known as "Lady Bird's Bill". She received the Presidential Medal of Freedom in 1977, and the Congressional Gold Medal in 1988, the highest honor bestowed upon a US civilian.

=== Lynda Bird Johnson Robb ===
Born on March 19, 1944, in Washington, D.C. She is the elder of the two daughters of Lyndon B. Johnson. She served as chairwoman of the Board of Reading is Fundamental (RIF), the nation's largest children's literacy organization, as well as chairwoman of the President's Advisory Committee for Women.

In 1967, she married Chuck Robb, who later served as the Governor of Virginia. She is the oldest living child of a US president, following the death of John Eisenhower on December 21, 2013.

=== Luci Baines Johnson ===
Born on July 2, 1947, in Washington, D.C. She is the younger of the two daughters of Lyndon B. Johnson. Her name was originally spelled "Lucy", but she changed the spelling in her teens as a rebellion against her parents.

Since 1993, she has been the chairman of the board and manager of LBJ Asset Management Partners, a family office, as well as chairman of the board of BusinesSuites. She is on the board of directors of the LBJ Foundation and has served on multiple civic boards raising funds for The Lady Bird Johnson Wildflower Center and the American Heart Association.

== Ancestry ==
The earliest known ancestor of Lyndon B. Johnson dates back to 1795. Most of his relatives were born and raised in Texas, but his paternal grandfather was born in Wedowee, Alabama.

Ancestry of Lyndon B. Johnson

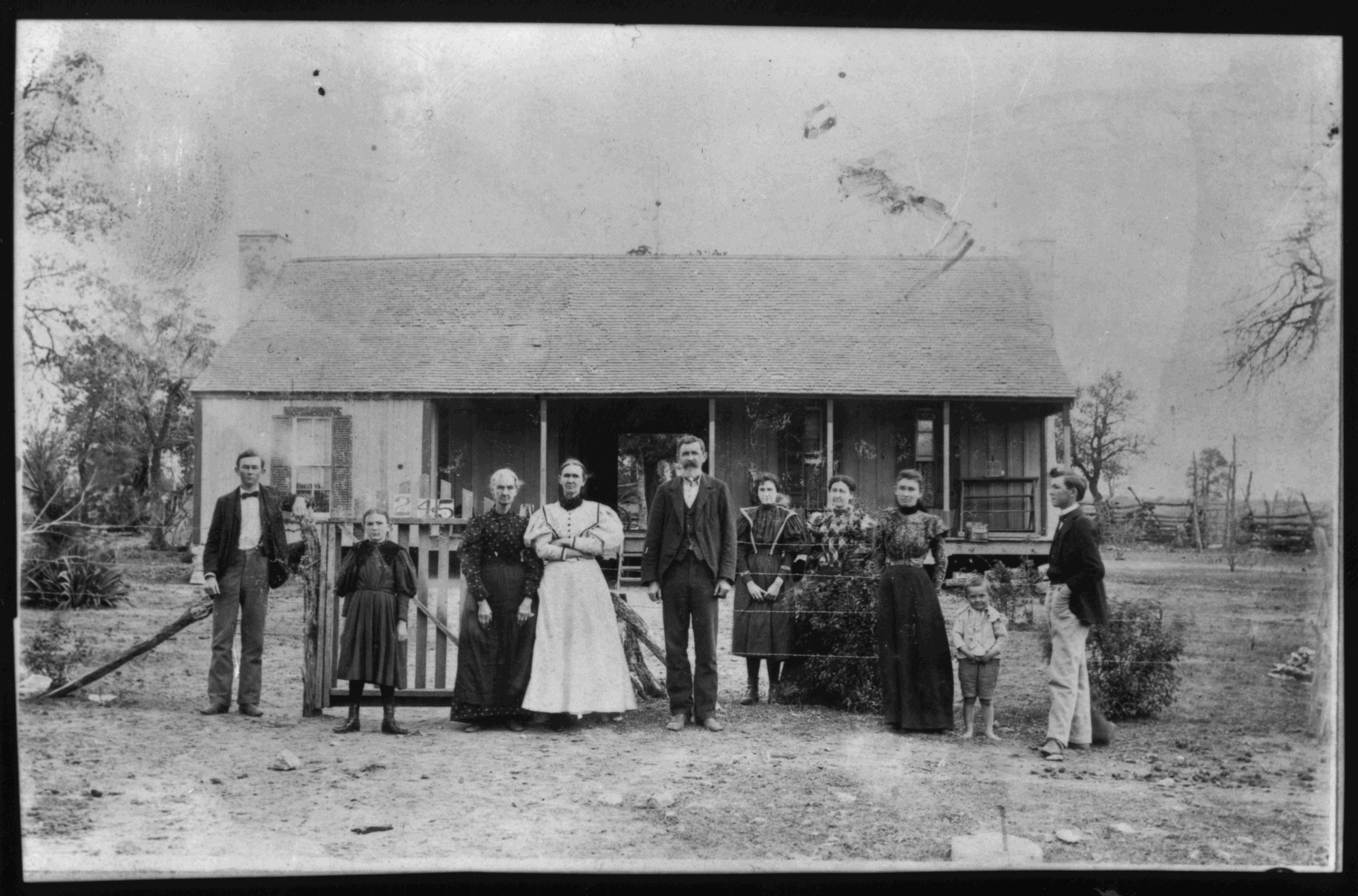
The Johnson Family in front of their home (later the birthplace of Lyndon Johnson). Sam Ealy Johnson Sr. (center) with family members. On his right is his wife, Eliza Bunton Johnson; to her right is her mother, Priscilla Jane McIntosh Bunton. In or near Stonewall, Texas

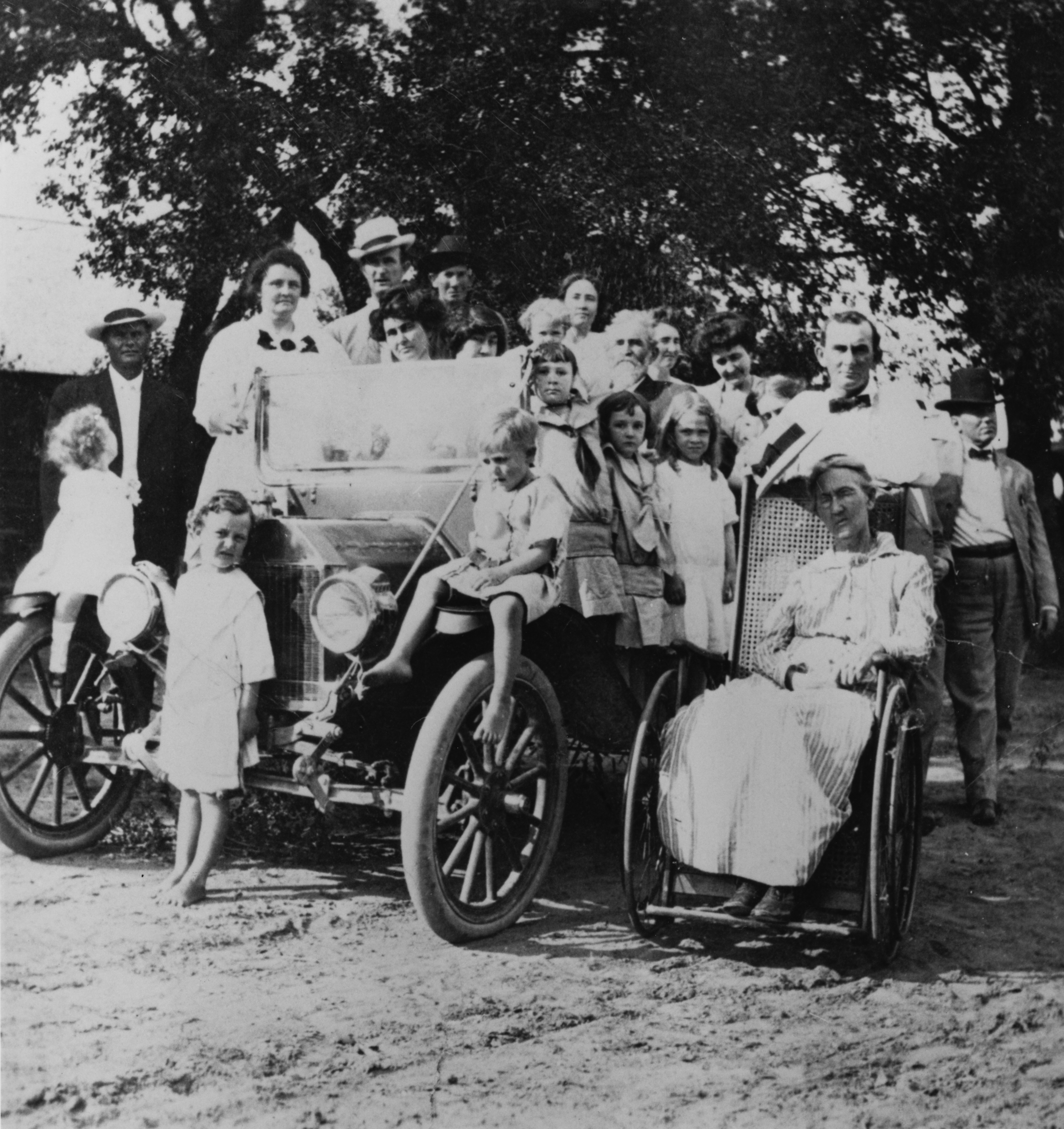
A Johnson Family gathering in 1912. The third adult from left in the back row is Sam Ealy Johnson Jr. His wife, Rebekah Baines Johnson, is in front of him. Sam Ealy Johnson Jr.'s mother, Eliza Bunton Johnson, is seated in the wheelchair. Lyndon B. Johnson (four years old) is standing in front of the automobile.

=== Parents ===
==== Samuel Ealy Johnson Jr ====
Samuel Ealy Johnson Jr. was born on October 11, 1877. He was an American businessman and politician, who was a Democratic member of the Texas House of Representatives representing the 89th District. He served in the 29th, 30th, 35th, 37th, and 38th Texas Legislatures.

==== Rebekah Baines Johnson ====
Rebekah Baines Johnson was born on June 26, 1881. She married Samuel Ealy Johnson Jr. on August 20, 1907. They had five children, Lyndon B. Johnson being the eldest. She died on September 12, 1958.

=== Grandparents ===
==== Samuel Ealy Johnson Sr. ====
Samuel Ealy Johnson Sr. was born on November 12, 1838, in Wedowee, Alabama. He was the paternal grandfather of Lyndon B. Johnson and was the tenth child of Lucy Webb (Barnett) and Jess Johnson. He was raised a Baptist, but he later became a member of the Christian Church. He was present at the Battle of Galveston and at the Battle of Pleasant Hill in Louisiana. He died on February 25, 1915.

==== Eliza Bunton ====
Eliza Bunton was born on June 24, 1849, in Caldwell County. She married Samuel Ealy Johnson Sr. on December 11, 1867, and had a son. She died on January 30, 1917.

=== Genealogical table ===
The following is a genealogical table of ancestors of Lyndon B. Johnson.

8. Jesse Johnson
4. Samuel Ealy Johnson Sr.
9.Lucy Webb Barnett
2. Samuel Ealy Johnson Jr.
10. Robert Holmes Bunton
5. Eliza Bunton
11. Priscilla Jane McIntosh
1. Lyndon B. Johnson
12. George Washington Baines
6. Joseph Wilson Baines
13. Melissa Ann Butler
3. Rebekah Baines Johnson
14. John Smith Huffman, Jr.
7. Ruth Ament Huffman
15. Mary Elizabeth Perrin
