= Center Hill, Mississippi =

Unincorporated community in DeSoto County, Mississippi

- Unincorporated community
- Location within Mississippi Location within the United States
- Coordinates: 34.9889821°N 89.7492518°W
- Country: United States
- State: Mississippi
- County: DeSoto
- Elevation: 354 ft (108 m)
- Time zone: UTC-6 (Central (CST))
  - Summer (DST): UTC-5 (CDT)
- ZIP code: 38654
- Area code: 662

Center Hill, historically Centre Hill, is an unincorporated community in DeSoto County, Mississippi, United States. It is located east of Olive Branch, Mississippi.

== History ==
Semple Broaddus College, also known as the University of DeSoto, a Baptist college, was located in Centre Hill. In the January 1, 1857, issue of The Memphis Daily Appeal, there is an announcement from the Secretary of the Board of Trustees, Robert Wilson, that the first classes of the college were to be held on February 21, 1857. William Carey Crane was the founder, chief promoter, and the president of the college from 1857 to 1860. The college was not successful and was of brief existence.

== Today ==
Today, there exists the Center Hill Elementary School, Middle School, and High School, the Center Hill Baptist Church, and the Center Hill Baptist Church Cemetery in the area, and they have Olive Branch, Mississippi, addresses.
