= Joseph Wilson Baines =

Texas politician and journalist (1846–1906)

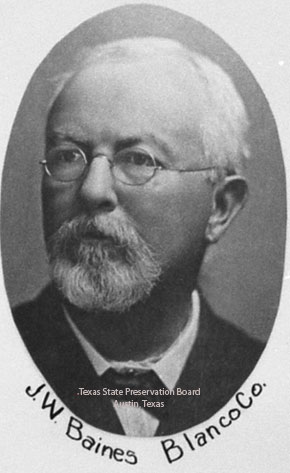
- Baines in 1903

Secretary of State of Texas
- In office January 18, 1883 – January 21, 1887
- Governor: John Ireland
- Preceded by: Thornton Hardie Bowman
- Succeeded by: John Marks Moore

Member of the Texas House of Representatives from the 89th district
- In office January 13, 1903 – January 10, 1905
- Preceded by: John Lowery Little
- Succeeded by: Samuel Ealy Johnson Jr.

Personal details
- Born: January 24, 1846 Mount Lebanon, Louisiana, U.S.
- Died: November 18, 1906 (aged 60) Fredericksburg, Texas, U.S.
- Resting place: Der Stadt Friedhof, Fredericksburg, Texas, U.S.
- Party: Democratic
- Spouse: Ruth Ament Huffman (m. 1869)
- Children: Rebekah; Huffman; Josefa
- Parents: George Washington Baines (father); Melissa Ann Butler (mother)
- Relatives: Samuel Ealy Johnson Jr. (son-in-law)
- Education: Baylor University

Military service
- Allegiance: Confederacy
- Branch/service: Confederate States Army
- Years of service: 1863–1865
- Unit: Mann's Texas Cavalry Regiment
- Battles/wars: American Civil War

Joseph Wilson Baines (January 24, 1846 – November 18, 1906) was an American journalist and politician. He was a Secretary of State of Texas and a member of the Texas House of Representatives. He was the maternal grandfather of U.S. president Lyndon B. Johnson.

Baines was born in Mount Lebanon, Louisiana, and his family moved to Anderson, Texas, when he was four. He was a son of George Washington Baines. He studied at Baylor University, then located in Independence, Texas. He entered the Confederate army "while quite a youth" with William McWillie Williamson's cadets, later joining Walter L. Mann's Texas Cavalry Regiment. He served for two years. There is not an exact match for his name on the National Park Service's Civil War Soldiers and Sailors System although it is possible he was misrecorded with the surname Barnes.

In 1868 he moved to Collin County, Texas, where he taught school for three years at Hide Out school and at Rowlett. He studied law under James W. Throckmorton and Thomas Jefferson Brown, the former governor and future chief justice of Texas, respectively. Baines began to practice law in Plano, Texas, in 1870, later moving to nearby McKinney the same year. Prior to his appointment as Secretary of State by John Ireland in 1883, Baines was the publisher, editor, and proprietor of the McKinney Advocate. He was re-appointed to the Secretaryship after Ireland's second inauguration. He was involved as owner and publisher of multiple papers in McKinney, Texas. Baines was the Secretary of State of Texas until 1887. Later, beginning in 1903, he was a member of the Texas House of Representatives for one term, and was succeeded by his future son-in-law Samuel Ealy Johnson Jr.

Baines married Ruth Ament Huffman, daughter of John S. Huffman, who was one of the Peter's colonists. Baines moved to Fredericksburg, Texas, after serving in the legislature. Both Baines and his wife are buried together at Der Stadt Friedhof, on the first row, near the National Museum of the Pacific War. They were the parents of Rebekah Baines Johnson, and the maternal grandparents of Lyndon B. Johnson, the 36th president of the United States. He died in Fredericksburg on November 18, 1906.

== See also ==
- Family of Lyndon B. Johnson

== Sources ==
- Conrad, David Eugene; Craddock, Emmie; Pool, William Clayton (1965). Lyndon Baines Johnson: The Formative Years. Austin: Southwest Texas State College Press. OCLC 475217.
- Goodwin, Doris Kearns (1991). Lyndon Johnson and the American Dream: The Most Revealing Portrait of a President and Presidential Power Ever Written. New York: St. Martin's Press. ISBN 0312060270. OCLC 975962635.

Political offices
| Preceded by Thornton Hardie Bowman | Secretary of State of Texas; 1883–1887 | Succeeded by John Marks Moore |
Texas House of Representatives
| Preceded by John Lowery Little | Member of the Texas House of Representatives from District 89 (Blanco); 1903–1905 | Succeeded by Samuel Ealy Johnson Jr. |
