= Jodie Laubenberg =

American politician (1957–2025)

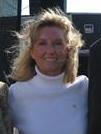
- Laubenberg in 2007

Member of the Texas House of Representatives from the 89th district
- In office January 14, 2003 – January 8, 2019
- Preceded by: Charlie Geren (moved to District 99)
- Succeeded by: Candy Noble

Personal details
- Born: April 20, 1957 Parker, Texas, U.S.
- Died: September 1, 2025 (aged 68)
- Party: Republican
- Education: University of Texas at Austin
- Occupation: Businesswoman, politician

Jodie Anne Laubenberg (April 20, 1957 – September 1, 2025) was an American politician from Texas. Laubenberg was a Republican member of the Texas House of Representatives from District 89 in Collin County in suburban Dallas, Texas.

== Early life and education ==
Laubenberg was born in Parker, Texas, on April 20, 1957. She earned a Bachelor of Arts degree from University of Texas at Austin.

== Career ==
From 2003, Laubenberg served as a Republican member of the Texas House of Representatives from District 89 in Collin County in suburban Dallas, Texas, until 2018. In 2018, Laubenberg chose not to run for reelection, instead opting to retire after serving 8 terms.

During the 78th Legislature, Laubenberg was chairman of the Health Committee. During the 84th and 85th legislatures, she was chairman of the elections committee.

== Personal life and death ==
Laubenberg was married to Bob. They had two children.

Laubenberg died at the age of 68 on September 1, 2025.

Texas House of Representatives
Preceded by Charlie Geren (moved to District 99)	Texas State Representative from District 89 (part of Collin County); 2003–2019	Succeeded by Candy Noble
