= Crane High School (Texas) =

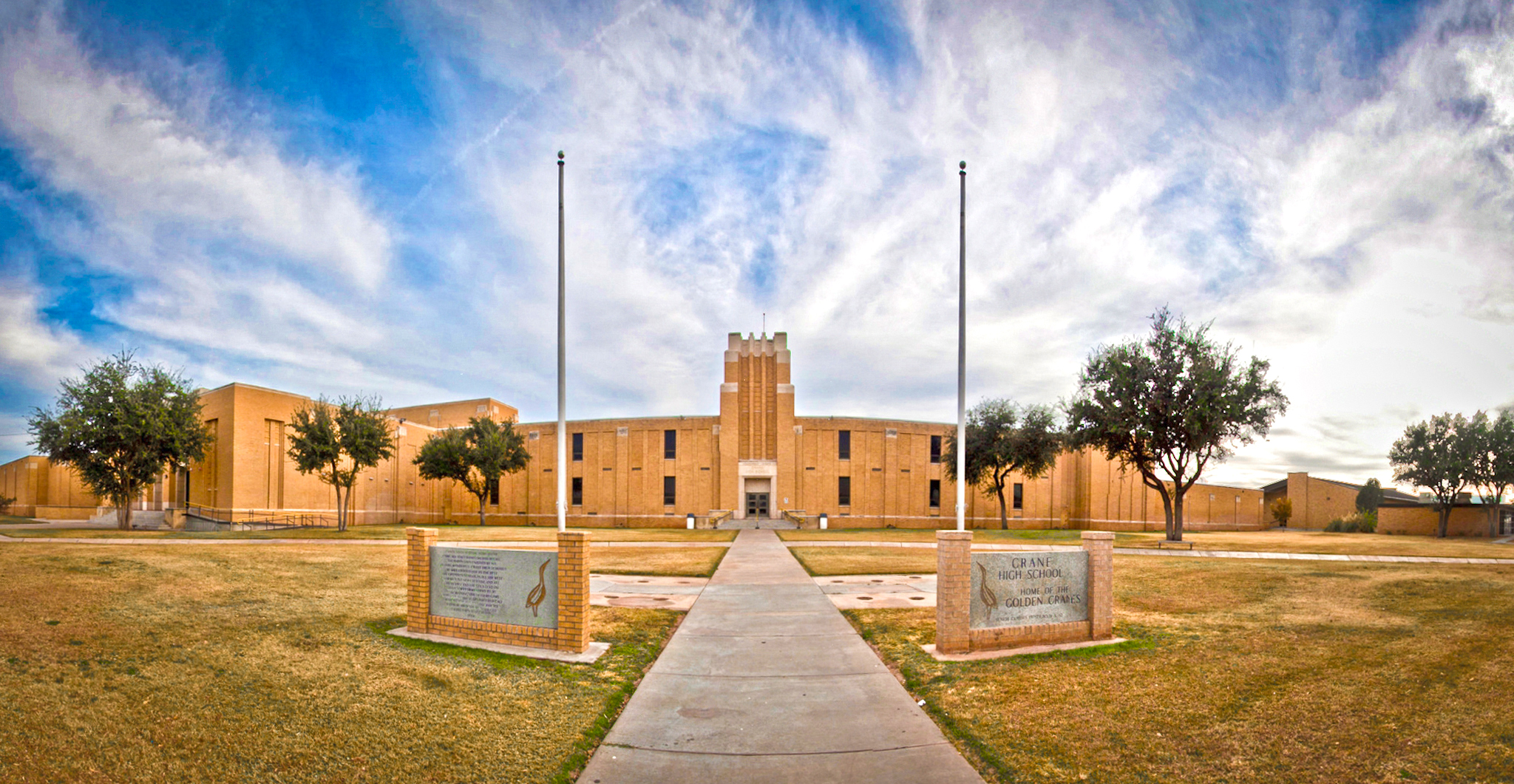

Location
- 809 West 8th Street; Crane, Crane County, Texas 79731; United States
- Coordinates: 31°23′39″N 102°21′15″W

Information
- School type: Public high school
- Motto: Spread Far the Fame of the Golden Cranes!
- School district: Crane Independent School District
- Superintendent: Vacant
- Principal: Rachel Gerig
- Assistant Principal: Ysmael Lujan
- Teaching staff: 29.33 (on an FTE basis)
- Grades: 9-12
- Enrollment: 333 (2023–2024)
- Student to teacher ratio: 11.35
- Colors: Purple & gold
- Athletics conference: UIL Class 3A
- Mascot: Golden Crane/Ladybirds
- Website: www.craneisd.com/o/crane-high-school

Recorded Texas Historic Landmark
- Designated: 2016
- Reference no.: 18392

Crane High School is a public high school located in Crane, Texas, United States. It is part of the Crane Independent School District which covers all of Crane County and is classified as a 3A school by the UIL. In 2015, the school was rated "Met Standard" by the Texas Education Agency.

== Athletics ==
The Crane Golden Cranes and Ladybirds compete in the following sports:

- Baseball
- Basketball, boys and girls
- Cross country, boys and girls
- Football
- Golf, boys and girls
- Powerlifting, boys and girls
- Softball
- Tennis, boys and girls
- Track and field, boys and girls
- Volleyball

=== UIL State Titles ===
- Boys Track Team:
  - 2006 (2A)
- Girls Track Team:
  - 2004 (2A)
- Volleyball Team:
  - 1970 (1A)^, 1974(1A)^, and 1975(2A)
- Boys Tennis:
  - 1962 (2A doubles) - Jerry Box and John Hoestenback
  - 1968 (2A doubles) - Glenn Fletcher and Jackie Box
  - 1971 (2A doubles) - Don Adams and Jay Box
  - 1972 (2A doubles) - Don Adams and Jay Box
  - 1972 (2A singles) - John Johnson
  - 1973 (2A doubles) - Don Adams and John Johnson
- Girls Tennis:
  - 1973 (2A doubles) - Terri Anderegg and Lynette Lewis

^ Was spring sport

Crane Bethune (PVIL)

- Boys Basketball Team:
  - 1958(PVIL-B), 1961(PVIL-B), 1962(PVIL-B)

== Academics ==
- UIL Academic Meet Champions:
  - 1992 (3A)
- UIL Editorial Writing:
  - 1984 (3A) - Wesley Moore
- UIL Feature Writing:
  - 1970 (2A) - Jill Rodgers
  - 1987 (3A) - Kristi Rey
- UIL News Writing:
  - 1972 (2A) - Cheryl Fox
  - 1982 (3A) - Tim Lowe
  - 1986 (3A) - Kristi Rey
- UIL Number Sense:
  - 1977 (2A) - David Bizzak
  - 1993 (3A Team) - Scott Huddleston, Ricky Solis, Peter Leupold
- UIL Persuasive Speaking:
  - 1967 (2A) - Thomas Morris
- UIL Poetry Interpretation:
  - 1978 (2A) - Dee Dee Smartt
  - 1979 (2A) - Dee Dee Smartt
- UIL Current Events:
  - 1992 (3A) - Keith Bullard
- UIL Cross-Examination Debate:
  - 1992 (3A) - Dusty Boyd and Thad Norvell

== Crane Golden Crane Bands ==
- UIL State Marching Band Championship Contest:

The Crane HS Band has had 19 UIL State Marching Band Contest appearances, and is currently tied for sixth most appearances (Classes A-6A) in the State of Texas overall.

Crane Golden Crane Marching Band State Appearances
Year	Class	Marching Show	Placement
2023	3A	"Imaginarium"	Finals - 10th
2021	3A	"Across the Universe"	Prelims - 17th
2019	3A	"Return of the Samurai"	Finals - 9th
2017	3A	"One Shot"	Prelims - 15th
2015	3A	"Gladiator"	Finals - 9th
2013	3A	"Dreams & Nightmares"	Prelims - 18th
2011	2A	"Mythology"	Finals - 9th
2009	2A	"Code of the Samurai"	Finals - 6th
2007	2A	"Cirque de Soleil" Quidam"	Prelims - 10th
2005	2A	"The Planets"	Finals - 4th
2003	2A	"West Side Story"	Finals - 5th
1998	3A	unknown	Finals - 7th
1996	3A	"The Beatles"	Finals - Silver Medal
1994	3A	unknown	Finals - 5th
1989	3A	unknown	Finals - Silver Medal
1988	3A	unknown	Finals - Silver Medal
1986	3A	unknown	Prelims - unknown
1984	3A	unknown	Prelims - unknown
1983	3A	unknown	Finals - 5th

- UIL Marching Sweepstakes:

1983, 1984, 1985, 1986, 1987, 1988, 1989, 1990, 1991, 1992, 1993, 1994, 1995, 1996, 1997, 1998, 1999, 2000, 2001, 2002, 2003, 2004, 2005, 2006, 2007, 2008, 2009, 2010, 2011, 2012, 2013, 2014, 2015, 2016, 2017, 2018, 2019, 2020, 2021, 2022, 2023

- UIL Concert & Sight-Reading Sweepstakes:

1984, 1985, 1986, 1987, 1988, 1989, 1990, 1991, 1992, 1993, 1994, 1995, 1996, 1997, 1998, 1999, 2000, 2001, 2002, 2003, 2004, 2005, 2006, 2007, 2008, 2009, 2010, 2011, 2012, 2013, 2014, 2015, 2016, 2017, 2018, 2019, 2020, 2021, 2022, 2023, 2024

- UIL State Wind Ensemble Contest Champions
  - 1987-1988 – Scott Mason, Director
  - 1988-1989 – Scott Mason, Director
  - 1989-1990 – Jesse Lotspeich, Director
- TMEA Honor Band
  - Crane HS Band - Scott Mason – Class 3A – 1990
  - Crane MS Band - Daniel Todd – Class C – 1998
- ATSSB All-State Musicians:

As of 2023-2024, Crane HS Students have qualified 151 ATSSB All-State Bands Musicians. Crane HS currently has the most ATSSB All-State Bands Musicians since the founding in 1991.
