= Samuel Ealy Johnson Jr. =

American politician (1877–1937)

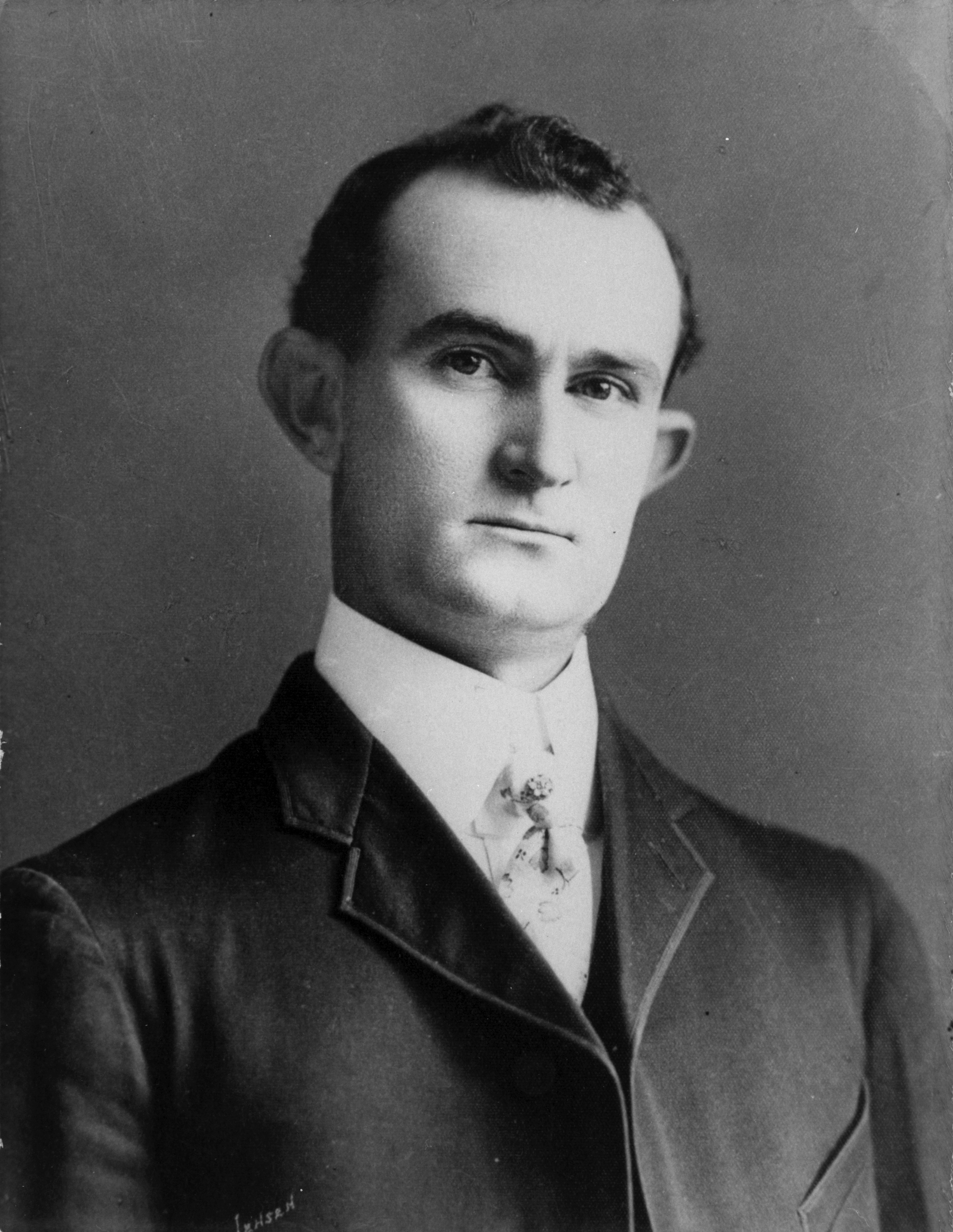
- Johnson in 1907

Member of the Texas House of Representatives
- In office January 10, 1905 – January 12, 1909
- Preceded by: Joseph Wilson Baines
- Succeeded by: William Bierschwale
- Constituency: 89th district
- In office February 6, 1918 – September 1, 1923
- Preceded by: William Bierschwale
- Succeeded by: Alfred P. C. Petsch
- Constituency: 87th district (1918–23); 85th district (1923)

Personal details
- Born: Samuel Ealy Johnson Jr. October 11, 1877 Buda, Texas, U.S.
- Died: October 23, 1937 (aged 60) Austin, Texas, U.S.
- Party: Democratic
- Spouse: Rebekah Baines (m. 1907)
- Children: 5, including Lyndon and Sam
- Parent: Samuel Ealy Johnson Sr. (father)
- Relatives: Family of Lyndon B. Johnson

Samuel Ealy Johnson Jr. (October 11, 1877 – October 23, 1937) was an American politician, businessman, and farmer who served six terms as a Democratic member of the Texas House of Representatives in the 29th, 30th, 35th, 37th, and 38th Legislatures. Residing in the Texas Hill Country, he faced challenges as a farmer and cattle speculator. Johnson was the father of Lyndon B. Johnson, the 36th President of the United States, and the son of Samuel Ealy Johnson Sr.

== Early life ==
Samuel Johnson was born in Buda, Texas, in 1877, the fifth child of Eliza Jane (née Bunton) and Samuel Ealy Johnson Sr., and showed intelligence at an early age. When he was ten years old, his family moved from Buda to the Pedernales. On his family's Pedernales farm, Johnson developed a strong sense of competition. In his teens he developed a desire to be "more than a farmer" and began attending a local school. However, at that time even so-called public schools required tuition, and Johnson's family struggled to afford the payments. When the barber of Johnson City retired, Sam bought his chair and tools with a loan and began practicing on his friends to gain skill at cutting hair. Once he learned, he was able to pay his school's tuition fees by selling haircuts in the evenings.

Johnson had to quit going to high school because of health problems, and his parents sent him to live on his uncle Lucius Bunton's ranch in Presidio County for several months. When he returned home, Johnson had ambitions to become a teacher; however, the hill country had no state-accredited high schools and no colleges at that time. He learned that he could get a state-issued teaching certificate without finishing high school by passing a state examination. In 1896, with the thirteen textbooks he needed to study for the exam, Johnson moved to his retired grandfather's nearby home to study in quiet.

Johnson passed the exam and, for the next three years, taught in one-room school houses throughout the hill country. He wanted to move on and become a lawyer, but financially he had to return home and work alongside his father on their family farm. Once his father became too old to work, Johnson began renting the farm from him and working it by himself. After a few years of plentiful rain and no flash floods, he had gained enough income to hire a number of farm hands and begin trading in cotton futures contracts in Fredericksburg. Considered a very friendly person, he became a popular figure in the area surrounding Johnson City.

== Personal life ==
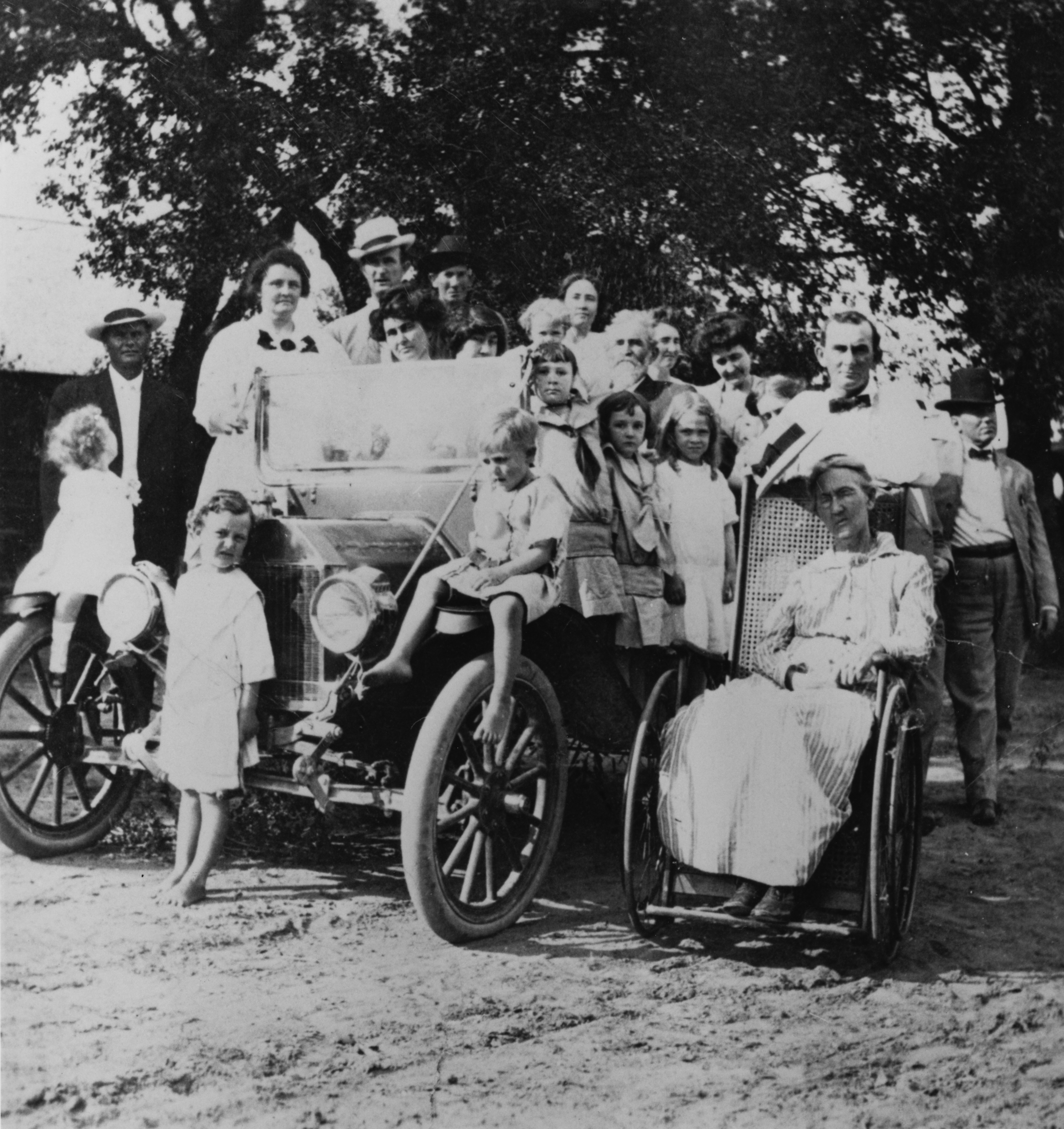
A Johnson Family gathering in 1912. The third adult from left in the back row is Sam Ealy Johnson Jr. His wife, Rebekah Baines Johnson is in front of him. Sam Ealy Johnson Jr.'s mother, Eliza Bunton Johnson is seated in the wheelchair. Lyndon B. Johnson (ca. 4 years old) is standing in front of the automobile.

Johnson married Rebekah Baines (1881–1958), daughter of Joseph Wilson Baines and his wife, on August 20, 1907. Their first child, Lyndon, was born on August 27, 1908. They had four more children: Rebekah (1910–1978), Josefa (1912–1961), Sam Houston Johnson (1914–1978), and Lucia (1916–1997).

According to Lady Bird, Lyndon’s wife, he planned to join the Christadelphian Church, where his father, mother and sister were members, toward the end of his life. He died in Austin, Texas, in late October 1937, aged 60.

== Political career ==
Sam Johnson served five terms in the Texas House of Representatives as a Populist Democrat. During his time in the state legislature, he fought against conservative Democrats who served business interests. While at the time, the lobbyists employed widespread bribery with the elected Texas officials. Representative Sam Johnson refused bribes and favors from lobbyists. His son, Lyndon Johnson used his father's record as a Populist to aid his own political career.

In 1896 and 1898, Republican Robert B. Hawley was elected by a plurality as Congressman, when the white vote was split between the Democrats and Populist Party. To reduce competition by Republicans and Populists, the state legislature in 1901 passed a poll tax, which had the desired effect of disfranchising most blacks, and many Latino and poor white voters. Texas effectively became a one-party state, like the other states of the former Confederacy in this period, and blacks were blocked from the political process until civil rights legislation was passed in the mid-1960s.

From 1867 to 1874 the Reconstruction era Republicans in the Texas Legislature had raised taxes to provide for the first universal free education, and to start establishing welfare institutions such as hospitals, to serve the people. To restrict the power of the legislature, the Democratic-dominated legislature amended the Constitution of Texas in a measure passed by remaining white voters. The amendment scheduled the legislature to meet only every other year as well as setting legislators' pay at five dollars a day—which would be reduced to two dollars a day if the legislature ran longer than 60 days.

=== First term (1905–1907) ===
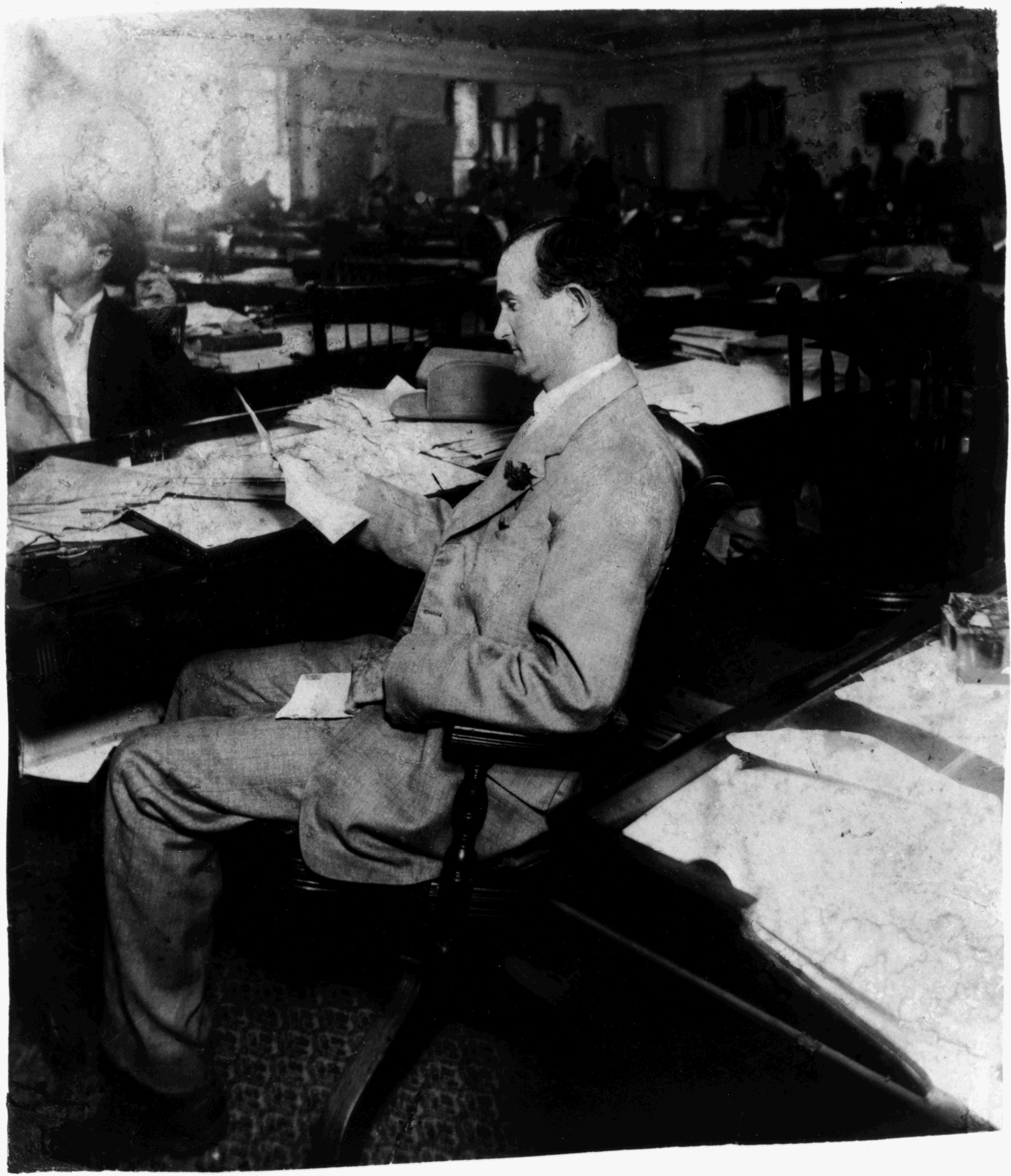
Sam Ealy Johnson Jr. as a Member of the Texas House of Representatives in 1905

Samuel Johnson's political career began in 1904, when his brother-in-law, Judge Clarence W. Martin, a former State Representative, encouraged him to run for the Democratic nomination to the state house from the 89th district. Given the Democrats' dominance by this time, the primary was the only competitive contest. Johnson won the Democratic nomination unanimously and in his acceptance speech, he cast his campaign as part of a larger populist movement, although the Populist Party had largely died out. He won the election against his Republican opponent by winning large margins in Johnson City as well as the small towns along the Pedernales River. His opponent, a Texas-German speaking lawyer, won only Gillespie County, a largely German and Republican area.

When he arrived at the Texas State Capitol in January 1905 at the age of 27, Johnson adapted well to the life of a legislator. Although relatively unsophisticated, he became an expert at parliamentary procedure. and persuading other legislators to his view. During his term he worked with two other legislators, "Honest Buck" Gray and Claude Hudspeth, to support Populist causes such as an eight-hour workday for railroad workers and a franchise tax for corporations. Although largely successful in terms of passing legislation, he and other populists were often on the losing side in trying to gain legislation to regulate Texas' large corporations.

One of Johnson's early political achievements was preserving the Alamo as a part of Texas' heritage. Although many Texans worked on this project, previous attempts had failed because of lingering questions over jurisdiction and because legislators balked at the asking price of $65,000 to purchase the fort. When Representative Johnson drafted the bill, he ensured the Alamo mission would be overseen by the Daughters of the Republic of Texas. On January 26, 1905, his bill passed into law. In 1905 Johnson also gained passage of legislation banning calf roping and a bill exempting Blanco County from state law requiring the payment of wolf bounties, which could have bankrupted the county.

=== Second term (1907–1909) ===
In the 1906 election, Johnson faced David Martin, the owner of the Martin Telephone Company and a resident of Llano County, Texas, in the Democratic primary. He had the support of newspapers in the four counties that comprised the 89th district. He won such large margins in the primary that the county Republicans did not put up a candidate for the general election.

In the 1907 session of the Texas State Legislature, the re-election of Senator Joseph Weldon Bailey was the most controversial issue. In 1907, Senators were still elected by their state legislatures. The Seventeenth Amendment to the United States Constitution, which allowed for the direct election of Senators, had not yet been passed. Although Joseph Weldon Bailey had been one of the most prominent populists in the country at one time, in 1906 his opponents had accused him of taking large legal fees from railroads, lumber companies, and Standard Oil. Samuel Johnson was one of a few members of the legislature who tried to postpone Bailey's election until the Texas House of Representatives had conducted an investigation. When Bailey, backed by a number of railroads and oil companies, arrived at the Texas State Capitol, his forces bribed nearly all 133 members of the House of Representatives to vote in his favor. Despite being thousands of dollars in debt, Samuel Johnson refused any attempt to sway his vote. He did not vote for Bailey, and he was one of seven members to vote present.

His stand against business interests made him a hero to political observers in Austin as well as his constituents in the 89th district. Party officials in all four counties encouraged him to run for a third term, but because of his financial problems, Johnson left the legislature, returning to his farm in the Hill Country. Although most returning representatives were offered patronage jobs in the state government or with a railroad, oil company, or bank, because Samuel Johnson had refused to take bribes throughout his career, he was not offered one.

=== Third Term (1918–1919) ===
In November 1917, a special election was called to fill a vacancy in the 89th district, the seat Samuel Johnson had vacated ten years earlier. In the interim, between 1907 and 1917, Johnson had re-established his financial standing and owned a number of local businesses. His reputation remained intact, largely because of his reputation of helping others. In April 1917, farmers from Blanco County elected him to the local draft board. When Johnson decided to run in the special election, no one ran against him, and he served out the rest of the term.

=== Fifth Term (1921–1923) ===
On January 24, 1921, Johnson was appointed vice-chair of the House Committee on Representative Districts.

=== Sixth Term (1923) ===
In 1923, Johnson was chair of the House Committee on Municipal and Private Corporations.

== Business career ==
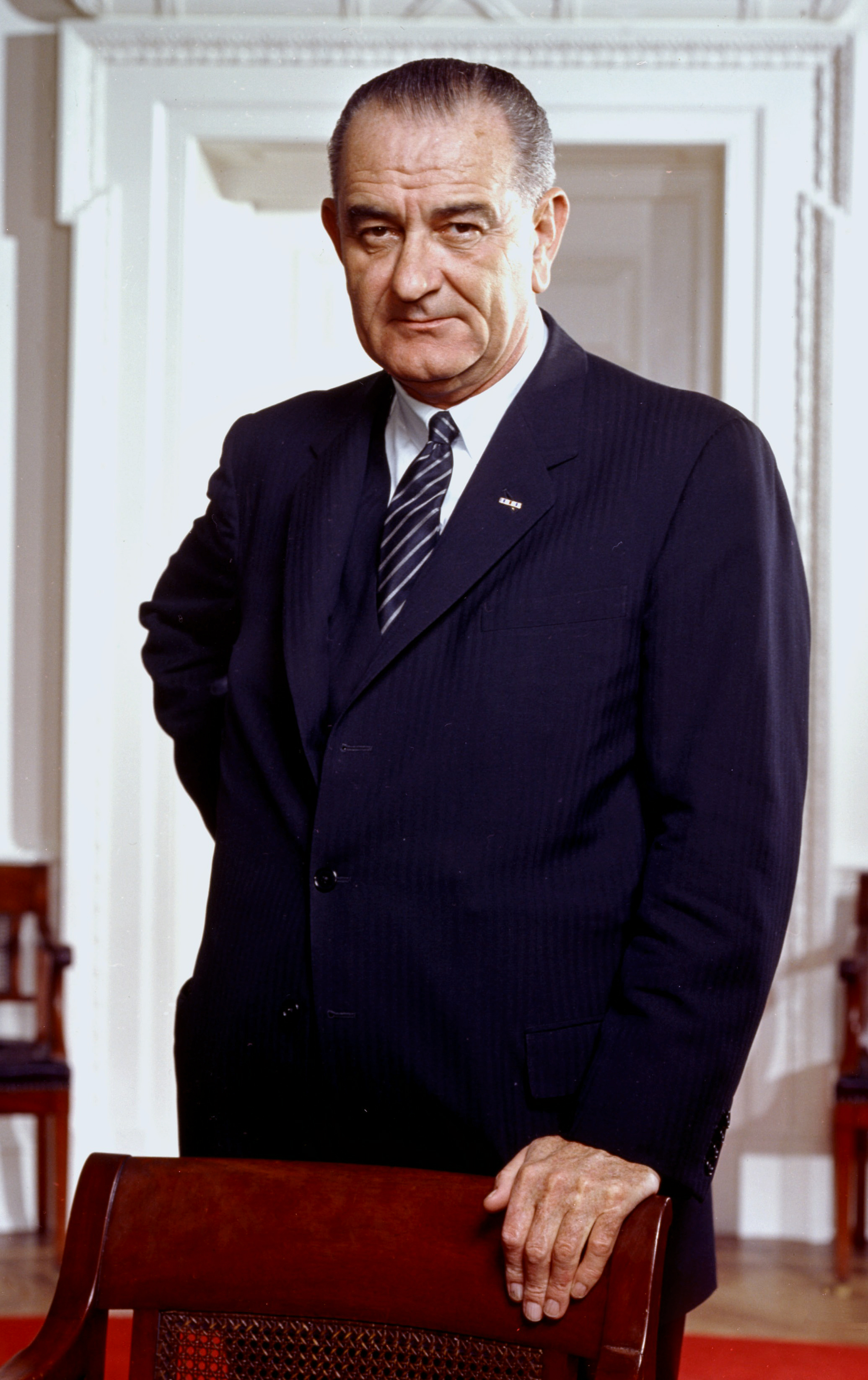
Portrait of Samuel Johnson's son, Lyndon B. Johnson

Samuel Johnson had made gains in the cotton futures market in 1902, 1903, and 1904; however in 1905, he lost all of the money he had invested. His son Lyndon later noted, "My daddy went busted waiting for cotton to go up to twenty-one cents a pound, and the market fell apart when it hit twenty". In 1906, he took out a loan and bought futures contracts on margin, but lost money again. When Johnson arrived in the Texas State Capitol after his election in 1906, he was "several thousand dollars in debt".

After retiring from the legislature in 1909, Johnson began to buy and sell real estate in addition to farming. He did well in selling real estate, so much so that he hired a local teenager as a chauffeur and paid a staff of cleaning ladies to handle household tasks for his wife. However, Johnson would also lose money, which resulted in the Johnson family living in poverty. He re-invested the profits from real estate into buying local businesses. Johnson bought several ranches, a small movie theater, as well as the only hotel in Johnson City. In 1916, he bought the local newspaper, the Johnson City Record, an "eight page weekly" from its owner. Four months later, Johnson sold the paper to Reverdy Giddon, as many of his subscribers could not pay in cash. Having regained his financial footing, he ran for a third term in 1917.

In 1920, Johnson sold all of his real estate, and went $40,000 into debt to restart cotton farming. He was motivated by post-WWI cotton prices, which were $0.40, but expected to rise to $0.50 or $0.60. Heavy spring storms repeatedly washed away the crops, and cotton prices fell to $0.08. The Johnson family lost everything.

== Bibliography ==
- Caro, Robert A. (1982), The Years of Lyndon Johnson: The Path to Power, Vintage Books, ISBN 978-0-679-72945-7
- Savage, Sean J. (2004), JFK, LBJ, and the Democratic Party, SUNY Press, ISBN 978-0-7914-6169-3

Texas House of Representatives
Preceded by Joseph Wilson Baines	Member of the Texas House of Representatives from District 89 (Hye)^{^{(1)}} 1905–1909	Succeeded by William Bierschwale
Preceded by William Bierschwale	Member of the Texas House of Representatives from District 87 (Fredericksburg)^{^{(2)}} 1918–1923	Succeeded by Ben F. Foster
Preceded by William Alexander Black	Member of the Texas House of Representatives from District 85 (Johnson City); 1923	Succeeded by Alfred P. C. Petsch
Notes and references
1. Hye for 29th Legislature and Stonewall for the 30th.; 2. Fredericksburg for 35th Legislature, Johnson City for the 36th, and Stonewall for the 37th.
