= Samuel Ealy Johnson Sr. =

American politician, businessman, farmer, and rancher (1838–1915)

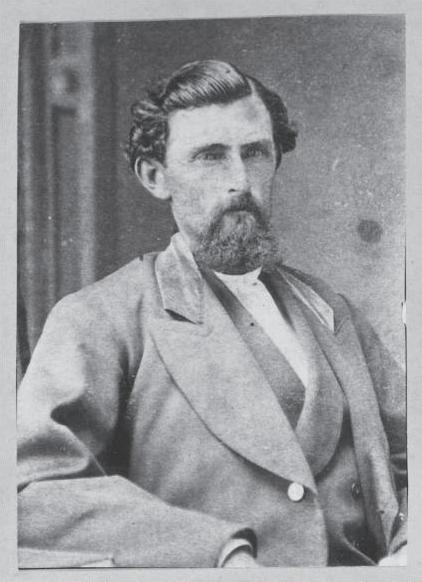
- Born: Samuel Ealy Johnson; November 12, 1838; Wedowee, Alabama, U.S.
- Died: February 25, 1915 (aged 76); Gillespie County, Texas, U.S.
- Resting place: Johnson Family Cemetery
- Occupations: Politician; businessman; farmer; rancher
- Political party: Populist
- Spouse: Eliza Bunton (m. 1867)
- Children: 9, including Samuel Jr.
- Relatives: Johnson family
- Military service
- Allegiance: Confederate States
- Branch: Confederate States Army
- Service years: 1861–1865
- Rank: Private
- Units: Company B, 26th Texas Cavalry Regiment
- Battles: American Civil War; Battle of Galveston Bay; Battle of Mansfield; Battle of Pleasant Hill

Samuel Ealy Johnson Sr. (November 12, 1838 – February 25, 1915) was an American politician, businessman, farmer, and rancher. He was the grandfather of U.S. president Lyndon B. Johnson.

== Early life ==
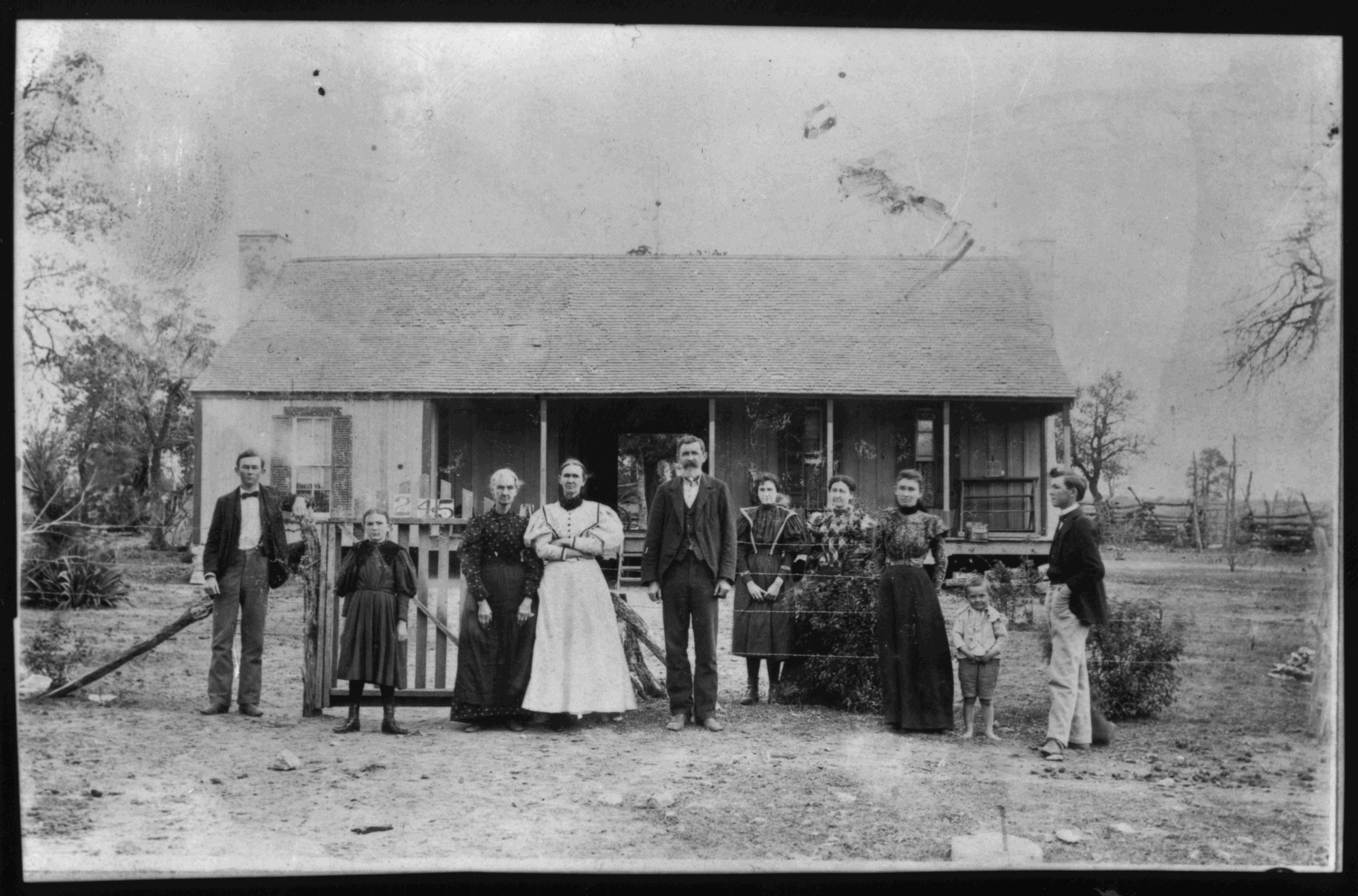
The Johnson Family in front of their home near Stonewall, Texas (birthplace of LBJ). Sam Ealy Johnson Sr. (center) with other family members. On his right is Eliza.

Johnson was born in Wedowee, Alabama, the 10th child of Jesse and Lucy Webb (née Barnett) Johnson. Reared a Baptist, he later became a member of the Christian Church. In his later years, he became a Christadelphian, following his wife and daughter.

== Career ==
In the late 1850s, Johnson settled with his brother Jesse Thomas Johnson, better known as Tom Johnson, in a one-room log cabin on 320 acres that became headquarters for the largest cattle driving operation in seven counties. Sam enlisted in Company B, 26th Texas Cavalry Regiment on September 18, 1861, and served until the end of the American Civil War on the coast of Texas and in Louisiana. Johnson participated in the Battle of Galveston and the Red River Campaign in Louisiana. After the war, he married Eliza Bunton of Caldwell County on December 11, 1867.

By 1890, Johnson had become active in politics as a member of the Gillespie County branch of the Farmer's Alliance, advocating for the issuance of greenbacks and for government intervention to stabilize crop prices. In the fall of 1892, Johnson was the Populist nominee for Blanco and Gillespie counties to the Texas House of Representatives. He died in Texas of pneumonia in early 1915.
