= Crane Independent School District =

School district in Texas

Location
- Crane, Texas ESC Region 15 United States

District information
- Type: Public
- Motto: Spreading Far the Fame of the Golden Cranes
- Grades: Pre-K through 12
- Superintendent: Vacant
- School board: Vacant - Position 1, Sally Dodd - Position 2, Rose Mary Cavazos - Position 3, Azuzena Morales - Position 4, Ricky Flores - Position 5, Tyler Esparza - Position At-Large 1, Anna Valenzuela-Gonzales - Position At-Large 2
- Chair of the board: Sally Dodd
- Schools: Crane Elementary School, Crane Middle School, and Crane High School

Students and staff
- Students: 1150
- Athletic conference: UIL Class AAA (11-man football participant)
- District mascot: Golden Cranes & Ladybirds
- Colors: Purple & gold

Other information
- Website: www.craneisd.com

Crane Independent School District is a public school district based in Crane, Texas, United States. The district's boundaries parallel that of Crane County. In 2009, the school district was rated "academically acceptable" by the Texas Education Agency.

== Schools ==
The district has three campuses:

- Crane High School (grades 9–12)
- Crane Middle School (grades 6–8)
- Crane Elementary School (prekindergarten-grade 5)

Consistent with the school's (and county's) name, the mascot is the Golden Cranes/Ladybirds.

== Activities ==
In the fall of 2023, the Crane High School's Crane Golden Crane Marching Band received its 41st year of Division Ones at the UIL Region Marching Contest, and 2023-2024 marked the 41st year in a row the Crane High School Crane Golden Crane Band has received Sweepstakes for attaining the highest rating (1) in UIL Marching and Concert and Sight-reading contests. The band advanced to the UIL State Marching Band Championship for its 19th appearance, tied for sixth-most appearances in Texas overall (A - 6A).
