= Mount Lebanon, Louisiana =

- Town
- Location of Mount Lebanon in Bienville Parish, Louisiana.

- Location of Louisiana in the United States
- Coordinates: 32°30′02″N 93°02′59″W
- Country: United States
- State: Louisiana
- Parish: Bienville

Area
  - Total: 4.03 sq mi (10.44 km^{2})
  - Land: 4.03 sq mi (10.44 km^{2})
  - Water: 0 sq mi (0.00 km^{2})
- Elevation: 325 ft (99 m)

Population (2020)
  - Total: 66
  - Density: 16.4/sq mi (6.32/km^{2})
- Time zone: UTC-6 (CST)
  - Summer (DST): UTC-5 (CDT)
- Area code: 318
- FIPS code: 22-52740
- GNIS feature ID: 2406207

Mount Lebanon is a town in Bienville Parish, Louisiana, United States. As of the 2020 census, Mount Lebanon had a population of 66.

== History ==
Mount Lebanon was probably the first permanent settlement in what is now Bienville Parish. Its pioneers were Baptists from South Carolina who quickly established a church and school. The school became Mount Lebanon University in 1853, but closed during the Civil War to serve as a high school and a Confederate hospital. After the war the school reopened. After years of struggling, it was consolidated in 1906 through the Louisiana Baptist Convention into Louisiana College in Pineville in Rapides Parish in central Louisiana.

The Mount Lebanon Baptist Church was organized in 1837, and the Louisiana Baptist Convention was established there in 1848. One of the Baptist organizers in Mount Lebanon was pastor George Washington Baines, maternal great-grandfather of future U.S. President Lyndon B. Johnson. The church building is still in use. The sanctuary is separated down the middle; men would sit on one side of the divide, women on the other. There is a balcony where the slaves were seated.

There are eight houses in the town that are on the National Register of Historic Places, including a building once used as a stagecoach stop and hotel. That was established by Emily Antoinette Bryan Smith around 1848 and is still owned by her direct descendants.

After the railroad was built through Gibsland, 3 miles (5 km) north, Mount Lebanon began to decline in population and economic opportunity. The post office was decommissioned in the 1950s.

== Geography ==
Mount Lebanon is located in northern Bienville Parish.

According to the United States Census Bureau, the town has a total area of 4.0 square miles (10.4 km^{2}), all land.

== Demographics ==
Historical population
Census	Pop.	Note	%±
1970	102		—
1980	105		2.9%
1990	102		−2.9%
2000	73		−28.4%
2010	83		13.7%
2020	66		−20.5%
2025 (est.)	62	▼	−6.1%
U.S. Decennial Census

As of the census of 2000, there were 73 people, 34 households, and 21 families residing in the town. The population density was 18.1 people per square mile (7.0/km^{2}). There were 44 housing units at an average density of 10.9 per square mile (4.2/km^{2}). The racial makeup of the town was 76.71% White and 23.29% African American.

There were 34 households, out of which 23.5% had children under the age of 18 living with them, 44.1% were married couples living together, 14.7% had a female householder with no husband present, and 38.2% were non-families. 35.3% of all households were made up of individuals, and 20.6% had someone living alone who was 65 years of age or older. The average household size was 2.15 and the average family size was 2.76.

In the town, the population was spread out, with 17.8% under the age of 18, 27.4% from 25 to 44, 19.2% from 45 to 64, and 35.6% who were 65 years of age or older. The median age was 48 years. For every 100 females, there were 82.5 males. For every 100 females age 18 and over, there were 93.5 males.

The median income for a household in the town was $46,250, and the median income for a family was $54,375. Males had a median income of $32,500 versus $30,417 for females. The per capita income for the town was $18,219. There were 10.5% of families and 13.8% of the population living below the poverty line, including no under eighteens and 25.0% of those over 64.

== Notable person ==
- Joseph Wilson Baines, Secretary of State of Texas and member of the Texas House of Representatives, grandfather of U.S. president Lyndon Baines Johnson.
