= Candy Noble =

Texas state legislator (born 1961)

Member of the Texas House of Representatives from the 89th district
- In office January 8, 2019 – January 12, 2027
- Preceded by: Jodie Laubenberg
- Succeeded by: Angie Carraway

Personal details
- Born: October 10, 1961 (age 65)
- Party: Republican
- Spouse: Robert Noble
- Children: 3
- Education: Hardin-Simmons University
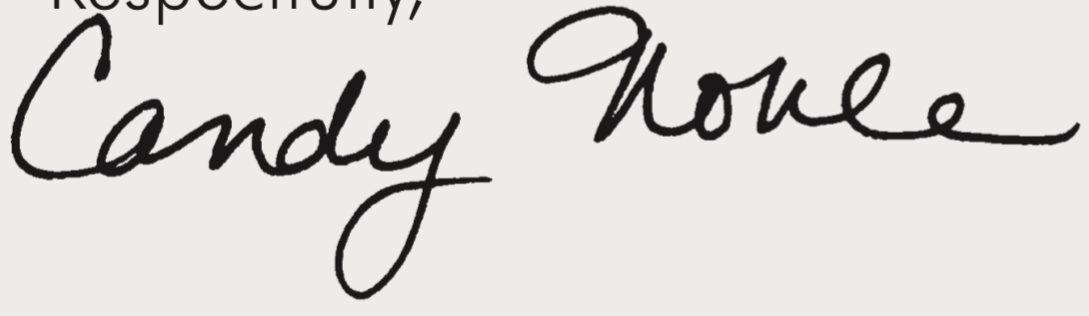
- Signature
- Website: Candy Noble website

Candace Thweatt "Candy" Noble (born October 10, 1961) is a Republican member of the Texas House of Representatives for District 89, situated in Collin County.

== Education and prior public service ==
Noble has a degree in education from Hardin-Simmons University in Abilene, Texas, and serves on the university's Board of Development.

Texas Governor Greg Abbott appointed Noble to serve on the Texas Juvenile Justice Board. Her service includes the Collin County CPS Board, the Collin County Parks and Open Spaces Board, and the State Republican Executive Committee. In 2016, Noble served as the Texas Electoral College Chair.

== Texas House of Representatives ==
The House District 89 seat was open in 2018 following the retirement of Jodie Laubenberg. Noble won the Republican nomination for the seat in the March 2018 primary election, receiving 54.23% of the vote and defeating John Payton; she went on to win the November 2018 general election with 59.54%, defeating Democratic opponent Ray Ash. Noble won reelection to the state House in 2020. In 2022, she ran unopposed for the Republican nomination and in the general election.

Noble was sworn in on January 8, 2019, to serve in the 86th Legislature.

In 2019, Noble introduced legislation (HB 1929) to prohibit state agencies and local governments from providing any public funds to, or engaging in any transaction with, entities that provide abortions, even for services unrelated to abortions. The bill targeted organizations such as Planned Parenthood. In 2021, Noble voted for the Texas six-week abortion ban bill.

In 2023, Noble introduced legislation (SB 1515) that would require every public school classroom in Texas to display a copy of the Ten Commandments.

In May 2023, Noble voted for the impeachment of Texas Attorney General Ken Paxton, a vote that divided Texas Republicans. In the 2024 Republican primary election, Noble faced challenger Abraham George, the previous chairman of the Collin County Republican Party. George's campaign was primarily funded by two far-right oil billionaires, Tim Dunn and Farris Wilks. Noble defeated George by 5%, though George was elected chairman of the Texas Republican Party the next year.

In November 2026, Noble lost her bid for reelection to her seat to Democrat Angie Carraway, receiving 49.2% of the vote to Carraway's 50.8%.

=== Committee assignments ===
- 86th Texas Legislature (2019-2021): Ways and Means; Human Services; General Investigating
- 87th Texas Legislature (2021-2023): Ways and Means; Human Services; Community-Based Care Transition, Oversight; Resolutions Calendars
- 88th Texas Legislature (2023-2025): Ways and Means; Human Services; Sustainable Property Tax Relief, Select Study
- 89th Texas Legislature (2025-2027): Ways and Means; Human Services; Ways and Means Subcommittee on Property Tax Appraisals (vice chair)

== Personal life ==
Noble and her husband, Robert, live in Lucas, Texas. They have three children and nine grandchildren. They are active members of Prestonwood Baptist Church.

Texas House of Representatives
Preceded by Jodie Laubenberg	Texas State Representative for District 89 (part of Collin County); 2019–	Succeeded by Incumbent
