= Texas's 89th House of Representatives district =

American legislative district

Texas's 89th State House of Representatives district
Representative
Candy Noble; R–Lucas
since January 8, 2019
- Demographics: 52.5% White; 11.7% Black; 19.3% Hispanic; 14.6% Asian
- Population (2020) • Voting age: 194,720; 139,747

District 89 is a district in the Texas House of Representatives. The district contains the southeastern portion of Collin County, Texas. It contains the cities of Josephine, Lavon, Lowry Crossing, Lucas, Nevada, Parker, St. Paul, and parts of Allen, Dallas, Fairview, McKinney, Murphy, Plano, Princeton, Royse City, and Wylie. The district has been represented by Candy Noble since 2019.

== Members ==
=== 20th century ===
- Joseph Wilson Baines (until 1905)
- Samuel Ealy Johnson Jr. (January 10, 1905 – January 12, 1909)
- William Bierschwale (after 1909)

=== 21st century ===
- Jodie Laubenberg (until 2019)
- Candy Noble (since 2019)
