= George Washington Baines =

American politician and journalist (1809–1882)

The Reverend George Washington Baines
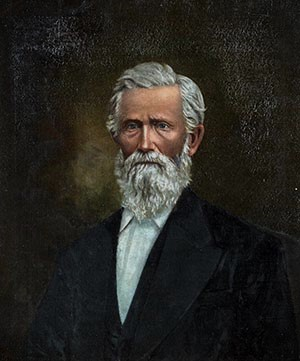
- Portrait by Henry Arthur McArdle

3rd President of Baylor University
- In office July 1861 – 1862
- Preceded by: Rufus Columbus Burleson
- Succeeded by: William Carey Crane

Member of the Arkansas House of Representatives from Carroll County
- In office November 7, 1842 – February 4, 1843

Personal details
- Born: December 29, 1809 Chowan County or Perquimans County, North Carolina, U.S.
- Died: December 28, 1882 (aged 72) Belton, Texas, U.S.
- Resting place: Old Salado Graveyard, Salado, Texas, U.S.
- Party: Democratic
- Spouses: Melissa Ann Butler (m. 1840; died 1865) Cynthia W. Williams (m. 1865; died 1882)
- Children: 9, including Joseph
- Relatives: Lyndon B. Johnson (great-grandson)
- Education: University of Alabama
- Profession: Baptist preacher; journalist; politician
- Known for: Co-founding Baylor University
- Awards: Honorary A.M. degree from Baylor University
- Scientific career
- Fields: Natural science
- Workplaces: Baylor University

George Washington Baines (December 29, 1809 – December 28, 1882) was an American politician, Baptist preacher, journalist, slaveowner, and educator. He was a co-founder, professor of natural science, and the third president of Baylor University, while the university was located in Independence, Texas, during the American Civil War.

He was the maternal great-grandfather of the 36th U.S. president, Lyndon B. Johnson. He was also the pastor and personal minister of Sam Houston while in Huntsville, Texas, and later bought a fourteen-year-old slave named Charles from him in 1862.

== Early life ==
Baines was born near the Atlantic Ocean in either Chowan County, or Perquimans County, North Carolina, on December 29, 1809, to Thomas Baines, a Baptist minister, and Mary (née McCoy) Baines. Baines was the eldest of ten children. The Baines family moved to Georgia in 1817, and then in 1818 to a farm near Tuscaloosa, Alabama, where he spent most of his childhood. Baines entered the University of Alabama, later leaving due to poor health in 1836. He paid his expenses by cutting and rafting timber.

== Career ==
=== Baptist ministry beginnings ===
In 1832, he was converted in a revival conducted by the famous baptist preacher Thomas Jefferson Fisher about ten miles south of Tuscaloosa, Alabama. He was baptized in Salem Baptist Church at the age of 25, and in 1834 he became licensed to preach by the Philadelphia Baptist Church of Tuscaloosa County. He was ordained by the Grant's Creek Baptist Church on August 7, 1836. His father was among the signers of his preaching license and certificate of ordination and is listed as the pastor of New Bethel Baptist Church.

=== Political career in Arkansas ===
In 1837, he settled in Carroll County, Arkansas, moving in an effort to recuperate from his recurring dyspepsia. He lived along Crooked Creek, about two miles southwest of present-day Harrison, Arkansas, the area today lies in Boone County. He soon after resumed his religious calling and helped to establish three churches, where he then preached. During this time, he was a missionary for the Baptist Home Mission Society of New York. In 1842, Baines was elected as a democrat to the Arkansas House of Representatives, representing Carroll County from November 7, 1842, to February 4, 1843. As a representative, Baines was a member of several select committees, including one to create Newton County. He was expelled by his church in Arkansas when it was seized by "hard shell Baptists" whose main point of disagreement with Baines was the concept of predestination.

=== Move to Louisiana ===
Baines baptized more than 100 people in Arkansas, where he lived for seven years, before moving to Mount Lebanon, Louisiana, with his family in July 1844. He was a pastor at the Rehoboth Baptist Church in Mt. Lebanon and was called as the first pastor of the Minden Baptist Church in Minden, Louisiana. He simultaneously pastored at Minden, Mt. Lebanon, Homer, and Saline. Baines was also the superintendent of schools in Bienville Parish. He was responsible for organizing the Louisiana Baptist Convention in 1848.

=== Later life in Texas ===
Baines moved to Huntsville, Texas, with his family in 1850. In Huntsville, he was the pastor and personal minister for Sam Houston. He was a member of the Board of Trustees of Baylor University from 1851 until 1859. He took his seat in a meeting in Independence on June 17, 1851, the same meeting Rufus Burleson was appointed president. Baines, working almost singlehandedly, established the Texas Baptist in 1855 in Anderson, Texas. He arranged the printing of the paper with R. A. Van Horn, publisher of Anderson's Central Texian. A former Baylor University professor, J. B. Stiteler, joined Baines as assistant editor. Baines became the first editor of the first Baptist newspaper in Texas, the Texas Baptist, while a member of the board of Baylor. Baines offered his resignation to the board in 1858, but his request was tabled, and he remained on the board until February 1, 1859.

A lengthy editorial in his newspaper, the Texas Baptist, from January 3, 1861, the writer of which was "probably G. W. Baines" (it was signed "B") attacked northern abolitionists, defended the condition of the slaves, and proceeded to place slaves in what the author deemed their "proper position:" "If the intellectual and moral condition of a race of men fit them only for despotic government, they will be slaves to their superiors wherever they may live, and to declare that they are equal in rights to the men who are fitted for a free republican, or a democratic government, is to declare what is positively absurd. They have not the capacity to understand or appreciate the rights, duties and responsibilities of a free citizen of a republican government, and therefore it is impossible that that morality can be sound which requires all human governments to allow men rights which they have no adequate conceptions of or capacities to exercise." In the editorial, the institution of slavery as a whole was defended, with the author writing "We are sure that God has given to us the right to buy and own slaves as a perpetual inheritance, and to transmit them to our children. We know that our Lord and the apostles recognized the institution of slavery as lawful, and made provisions both for masters and slaves in the first churches, and for these reasons we are determined not to be controlled by an ungodly and unchristian party of misguided fanatics in this matter. We are responsible to God and our fellow citizens first, and until they condemn us, or, rather, while God and our own people justify us, we shall not fear those who condemn us without a cause."

After Rufus Columbus Burleson departed the presidency of Baylor University for Waco University, Baines was appointed president by the Board, until they could find a suitable replacement for Burleson and during the Civil War. On July 27, 1861, Baines was awarded with an honorary Master of Arts degree by Baylor University. After his first year as president, the trustees found it difficult to find anyone to lead the financially-plagued university, and asked Baines to continue as president. He was re-elected president for the year 1863 by the Board of Trustees on June 25, 1862, after he had sent a letter from June 24 mentioning his reluctance to remain in the position on account of his health.

The time, for which I accepted the Presidency of Baylor University, expires with the present collegiate year. At your last meeting, I am informed, that you passed an order requesting me to continue my services until the end of the present year. It is my desire, that you allow me to decline this offer. My principal reason is that my state of health will not justify the confinement which is necessary to teach and control a school of little boys, seven or eight hours every day.

During the summer of 1862, a committee of correspondence was established by the Board of Trustees to enter negotiations with William Carey Crane to fill the vacancy in the office of the president left by Baines. Although Baines was the president for one year and only conferred one diploma, a stone marker at his grave and many Baylor University publications incorrectly state that Baines was president from 1861 to 1863. A page on the University of Mary Hardin–Baylor website falsely says Baines was president until 1864.

Shortly after leaving Baylor he moved to Fairfield, Texas, where his wife Melissa Ann and youngest son Johnny Paxton died. According to Janet Baines Brockett, a granddaughter of Baines, he had to build his son's coffin due to the scarcity that existed during the Civil War. He farmed in Fairfield and pastored at several churches in the area. Baines married his second wife, Cynthia W. Williams, on June 13, 1865. After the Civil War, he moved to Salado, Texas, in 1867 so his daughter Anna Melissa could attend Salado College. He later became the third minister of the Salado Baptist Church, the president of the Board of Trustees of Baylor Female College at Belton, Texas, and pastored at the First Baptist Church, Belton, in the early 1870s. He was the principal of the Davilla Institute in 1874.

=== Death ===
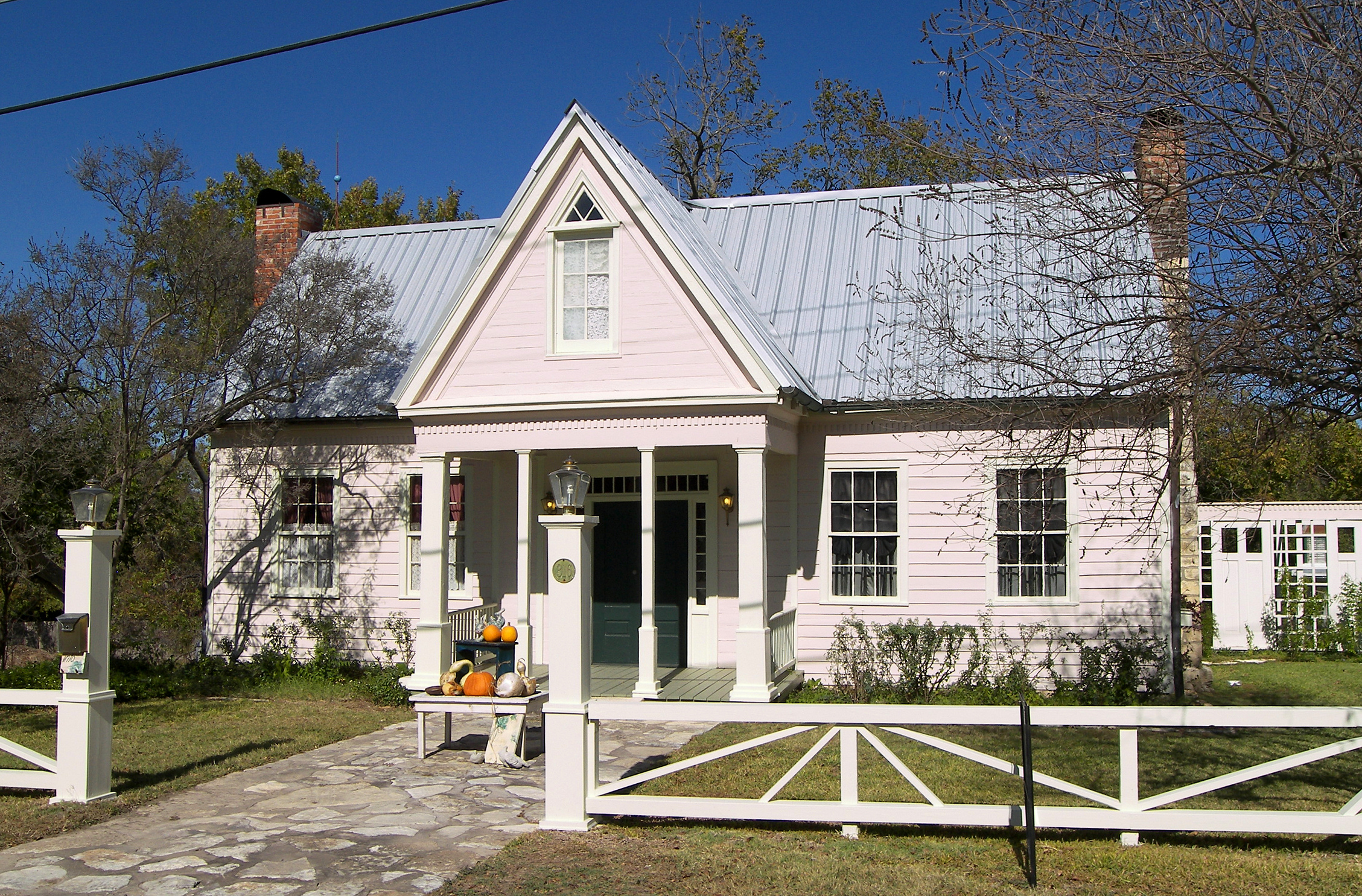
The George Washington Baines House in Salado, Texas, in 2008.

He devoted his life as a Christian leader; even with his chronic dyspepsia, he was a field agent of the Baptist State Convention for several years. After the death of his second wife in January 1882, he lived with his daughter Anna Melissa in Belton. Baines died on December 28, 1882, of malaria, a day before his 73rd birthday. At the time he was a pastor at Salado.

== Political and social views ==
Baines was a member of the Democratic Party when he was a member of the Arkansas House of Representatives between 1842 and 1843. He introduced resolutions asking the United States Congress to turn over "refuse lands" and worked to adopt the paper ballot and end voice voting.

=== Slavery ===
Along with the other three founders of Baylor University, Baines was an owner of slaves. In the 1850 census, Baines is recorded as the owner of two slaves when he was the pastor of a church in Huntsville. In 1853, Baines owned one slave worth $700. By 1857, Baines was the owner of three slaves assessed with the total value of $2,200. In the 1860 census, when he was a pastor in Anderson at the time, Baines is recorded as the owner of eight slaves. He purchased a fourteen-year-old slave named Charles from Sam Houston on February 12, 1862, and promised to pay Houston on December 25, 1862. Baines also entered an agreement for Charles to receive "one suit of winter clothes and two suits of summer clothes, a pair of shoes and a blanket and to treat him in a humane manner." Baines was a forceful defender of slavery as editor of the Texas Baptist.

== Personal life ==
Baines was described by his church members in Arkansas as "a lithe, medium sized man... with deep blue eyes and coal black hair." He had nine children with his first wife, Melissa Ann (née Butler). He did not have any children with his second wife, Cynthia. His son Joseph Wilson Baines was a Secretary of State of Texas and a member of the Texas House of Representatives. The 36th U.S. president, Lyndon B. Johnson, was his great-grandson.

== Bibliography ==
- Ballard, D. La Pierre (1998). Logan, Jr., Roger V.; Boone County Historical & Railroad Society (eds.). History of Boone County, Arkansas. Paducah, Kentucky: Turner Publishing Company. ISBN 978-1-56311-423-6. LCCN 98-87945. OCLC 40745163.
- Lane, John Jay (1903). History of Education in Texas (PDF). Washington, DC: Government Printing Office – via Texas Legal Guide.
- Murray, Lois Smith (1972). Baylor at Independence. Waco, Texas: Baylor University Press. LCCN 2005007373. OCLC 1013922.
- Trantham, Henry (1921). 1845–1920, The Diamond Jubilee: A Record of the Seventy–Fifth Anniversary of the Founding of Baylor University. Baylor University Press. OCLC 2548423.
- Turnbo, Charles Alton (2007). Salado Texas: Frontier College Town. Salado, Texas: Yardley Publishing. ISBN 9780971743915. LCCN 2006936840. OCLC 141850483.

Academic offices
Preceded by Rufus Columbus Burleson	President of Baylor University; 1861–1862	Succeeded by William Carey Crane
Political offices
Arkansas House of Representatives
Preceded by Unknown	Member of the Arkansas House of Representatives from Carroll County (Crooked Creek); 1842–1843	Succeeded by Unknown
