= Crane County, Texas =

County in Texas, United States

- County
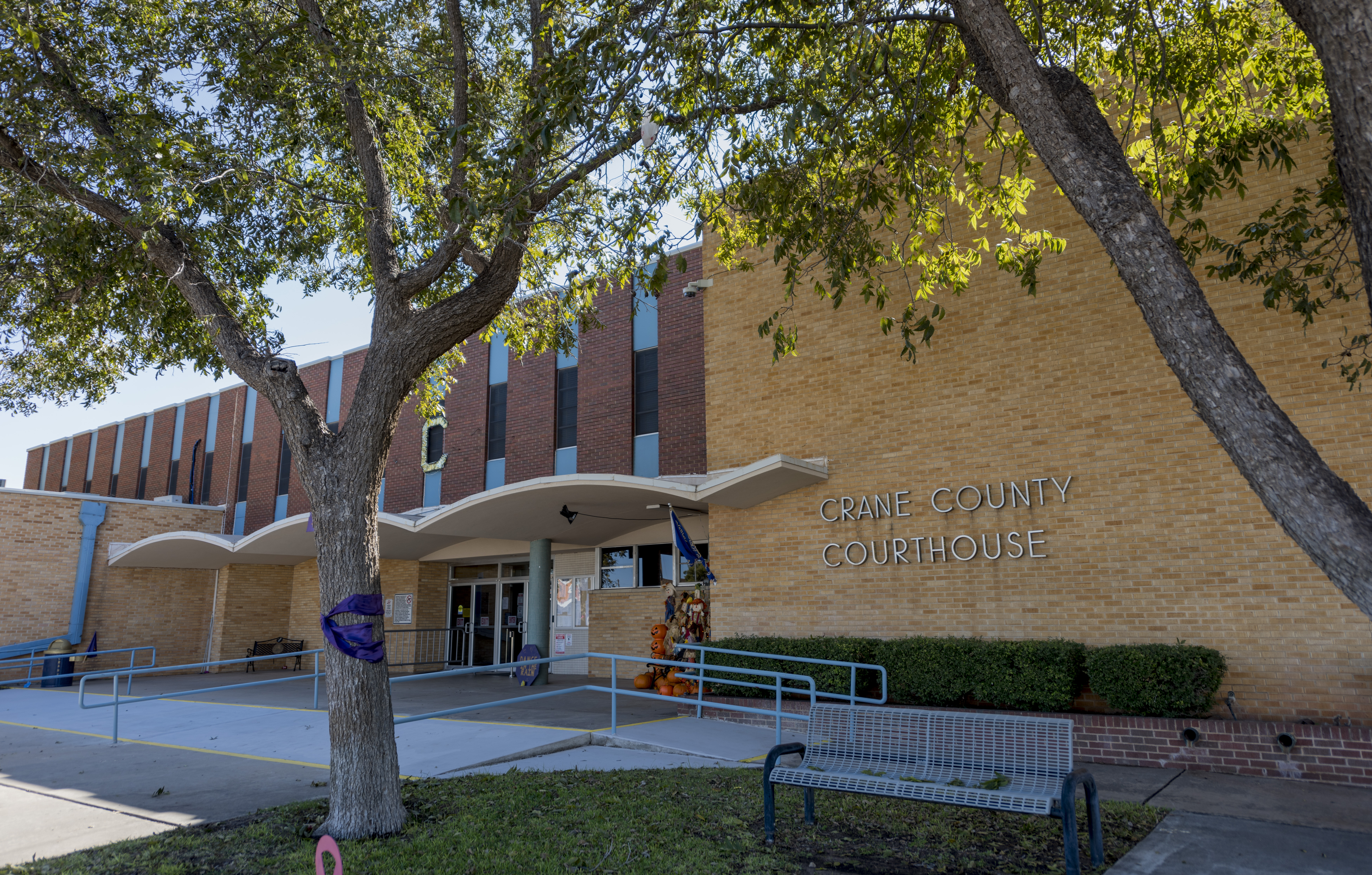
- Crane County Courthouse in Crane

- Location within the U.S. state of Texas
- Coordinates: 31°25′N 102°31′W
- Country: United States
- State: Texas
- Founded: 1927
- Named for: William Carey Crane
- Seat: Crane
- Largest city: Crane

Area
  - Total: 786 sq mi (2,040 km^{2})
  - Land: 785 sq mi (2,030 km^{2})
  - Water: 0.7 sq mi (1.8 km^{2}) 0.08%

Population (2020)
  - Total: 4,675
  - Estimate (2025): 4,554 ▼
  - Density: 5.96/sq mi (2.30/km^{2})
- Time zone: UTC−6 (Central)
  - Summer (DST): UTC−5 (CDT)
- Congressional district: 23rd
- Website: www.co.crane.tx.us

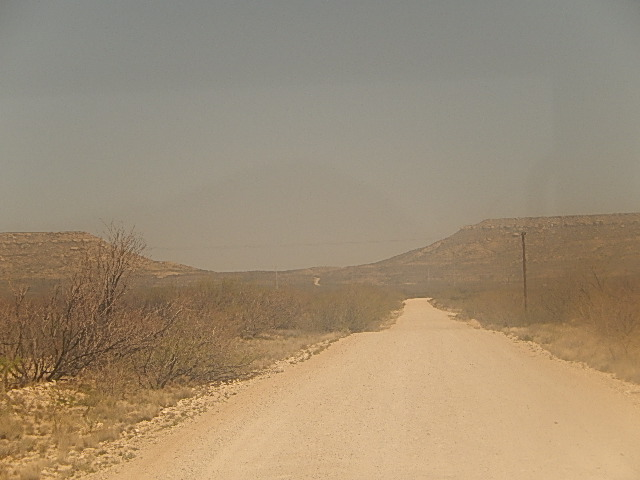
Road to Castle Gap between Crane and McCamey, Texas

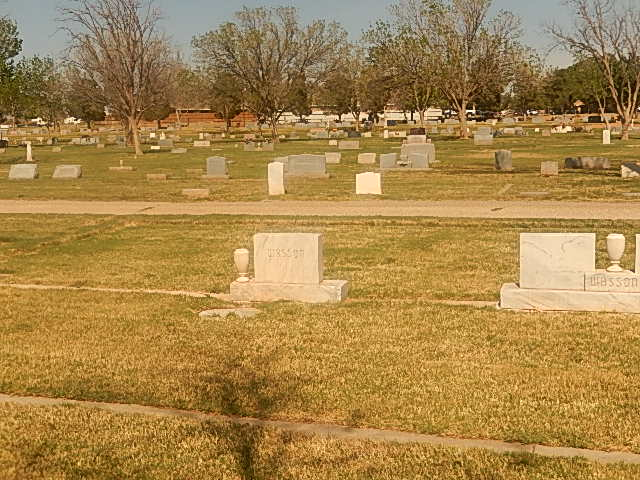
Graves at Crane County Cemetery off U.S. Route 385

Crane County is a county located in the U.S. state of Texas. As of the 2020 census, its population was 4,675. The county seat is Crane. The county was created in 1887 and later organized in 1927. It was named for William Carey Crane, a president of Southern Baptist-affiliated Baylor University in Waco, Texas.

== History ==
=== Native Americans ===
Indigenous peoples were the first inhabitants of the area. Later Indian tribes included Comanches, Lipan Apache, and Kiowa.

=== County establishment and growth ===
Crane County was formed in 1887 from Tom Green County, and named after William Carey Crane, former president of Baylor University. Settlement came years later, and the county was not organized until 1927. In 1900, the United States census enumerated only 51 people and 12 ranches in the county. As late as 1918, the county had no roads.

Church and Fields Exploration Company obtained a permit late in 1925 to drill for oil. The first well came in March 1926.

By 1927, an estimated 6,000 people were in the county, with 4,500 of them within the city of Crane. Water was trucked in and brought from $1.00 to $2.25 a barrel, though at times the rates could be as high as $5.00 a barrel. A barrel of drinking water would typically last a month if used judiciously, and barrels of nonpotable water were available for cleaning and washing purposes. Crane City was incorporated in the early 1930s, and with that came state funds for the building of a city water system. At the same time, the Texas Rangers were working to clean up oil towns, and the population in Crane began to include more families. As such, numerous raids by law enforcement closed the red light district centered on Alford Street. By the beginning of 1991, almost 1,552,324,000 barrels (246,799,800 m^{3}) of oil had been produced in the county since discovery in 1926.

County history is preserved in the Museum of the Desert Southwest, which opened in Crane in 1980.

== Geography ==
According to the U.S. Census Bureau, the county has a total area of 786 sq mi (2,040 km^{2}), of which 785 sq mi (2,030 km^{2}) are land and 0.7 square miles (1.8 km^{2}) (0.08%) is covered by water.

=== Major highways ===
- Interstate 20
- U.S. Highway 67
- U.S. Highway 385
- State Highway 329

=== Adjacent counties ===
- Ector County (north)
- Upton County (east)
- Crockett County (south)
- Pecos County (south)
- Ward County (west)

== Demographics ==
Historical population
Census	Pop.	Note	%±
1890	15		—
1900	51		240.0%
1910	331		549.0%
1920	37		−88.8%
1930	2,221		5,902.7%
1940	2,841		27.9%
1950	3,965		39.6%
1960	4,699		18.5%
1970	4,172		−11.2%
1980	4,600		10.3%
1990	4,652		1.1%
2000	3,996		−14.1%
2010	4,375		9.5%
2020	4,675		6.9%
2025 (est.)	4,554	▼	−2.6%
U.S. Decennial Census; 1850–2010 2010 2020

=== Racial and ethnic composition ===
Crane County, Texas – Racial and ethnic composition Note: the US Census treats Hispanic/Latino as an ethnic category. This table excludes Latinos from the racial categories and assigns them to a separate category. Hispanics/Latinos may be of any race.
Race / Ethnicity (NH = Non-Hispanic)	Pop 1980	Pop 1990	Pop 2000	Pop 2010	Pop 2020	% 1980	% 1990	% 2000	% 2010	% 2020
White alone (NH)	3,319	2,920	2,083	1,761	1,342	72.15%	62.77%	52.13%	40.25%	28.71%
Black or African American alone (NH)	126	128	116	122	70	2.74%	2.75%	2.90%	2.79%	1.50%
Native American or Alaska Native alone (NH)	7	11	14	34	14	0.15%	0.24%	0.35%	0.78%	0.30%
Asian alone (NH)	12	10	14	13	22	0.26%	0.21%	0.35%	0.30%	0.47%
Native Hawaiian or Pacific Islander alone (NH)	x	x	0	0	0	x	x	0.00%	0.00%	0.00%
Other race alone (NH)	8	6	1	10	1	0.17%	0.13%	0.03%	0.23%	0.02%
Mixed race or Multiracial (NH)	x	x	15	26	68	x	x	0.38%	0.59%	1.45%
Hispanic or Latino (any race)	1,128	1,577	1,753	2,409	3,158	24.52%	33.90%	43.87%	55.06%	67.55%
Total	4,600	4,652	3,996	4,375	4,675	100.00%	100.00%	100.00%	100.00%	100.00%

=== 2020 census ===
As of the 2020 census, the county had a population of 4,675. The median age was 34.9 years. 28.3% of residents were under the age of 18 and 13.5% of residents were 65 years of age or older. For every 100 females there were 102.4 males, and for every 100 females age 18 and over there were 99.9 males.

The racial makeup of the county was 53.2% White, 1.6% Black or African American, 0.8% American Indian and Alaska Native, 0.5% Asian, <0.1% Native Hawaiian and Pacific Islander, 19.6% from some other race, and 24.3% from two or more races. Hispanic or Latino residents of any race comprised 67.6% of the population.

Less than 0.1% of residents lived in urban areas, while 100.0% lived in rural areas.

There were 1,562 households in the county, of which 43.4% had children under the age of 18 living in them. Of all households, 57.7% were married-couple households, 16.2% were households with a male householder and no spouse or partner present, and 21.5% were households with a female householder and no spouse or partner present. About 19.9% of all households were made up of individuals and 7.5% had someone living alone who was 65 years of age or older.

There were 1,823 housing units, of which 14.3% were vacant. Among occupied housing units, 77.4% were owner-occupied and 22.6% were renter-occupied. The homeowner vacancy rate was 2.2% and the rental vacancy rate was 22.4%.

=== 2000 census ===
As of the 2000 census, 3,996 people, 1,360 households, and 1,082 families resided in the county. The population density was five people per square mile (1.9 people/km^{2}). The 1,596 housing units averaged two units per square mile (0.77 units/km^{2}). The racial makeup of the county was 73.70% White, 2.90% Black or African American, 0.98% Native American, 0.35%, 19.49% from other races, and 2.58% from two or more races. About 43.87% of the population were Hispanic/Latino of any race.

Of the 1,360 households, 43.40% had children under the age of 18 living with them, 67.80% were married couples living together, 7.90% had a female householder with no husband present, and 20.40% were not families. About 18.80% of all households were made up of individuals, and 9.50% had someone living alone who was 65 years of age or older. The average household size was 2.91, and the average family size was 3.35.

In the county, the population was distributed as 31.90% under the age of 18, 7.70% from 18 to 24, 26.90% from 25 to 44, 22.60% from 45 to 64, and 10.90% who were 65 years of age or older. The median age was 34 years. For every 100 females, there were 94.80 males. For every 100 females age 18 and over, there were 90.50 males.

The median income for a household in the county was $32,194, and for a family was $36,820. Males had a median income of $33,438 versus $16,806 for females. The per capita income for the county was $15,374. About 12.40% of families and 13.40% of the population were below the poverty line, including 15.30% of those under age 18 and 10.50% of those age 65 or over.

== Economy ==
The largest segment of the local economy is oil and gas production. The Waddell Ranch contains the single biggest portion of the Permian Basin Royalty Trust, with over 800 producing oil wells as of 2007. Crane County is one of the largest oil-producing counties in Texas, with a total of 1.5 billion barrels (240,000,000 m^{3}) of oil pumped since oil was first discovered there. Cattle ranching and local government are other large employers; over 503,000 acres (2,040 km^{2}) of land are used for livestock grazing.

== Communities ==
- Crane (county seat)

== Education ==
All of the county is in the Crane Independent School District.

All of the county is in the service area of Odessa College.

== Politics ==
Crane County has been dominated by the Republican Party since 1972.

United States presidential election results for Crane County, Texas
Year	Republican		Democratic		Third party(ies)	
Year	No.	%	No.	%	No.	%
1928	127	44.41%	159	55.59%	0	0.00%
1932	37	8.15%	416	91.63%	1	0.22%
1936	25	3.86%	622	96.14%	0	0.00%
1940	68	7.69%	815	92.19%	1	0.11%
1944	58	9.08%	552	86.38%	29	4.54%
1948	70	7.60%	812	88.17%	39	4.23%
1952	621	41.73%	857	57.59%	10	0.67%
1956	626	46.44%	707	52.45%	15	1.11%
1960	678	43.24%	848	54.08%	42	2.68%
1964	637	40.86%	919	58.95%	3	0.19%
1968	493	28.95%	498	29.24%	712	41.81%
1972	1,123	73.78%	349	22.93%	50	3.29%
1976	963	57.32%	664	39.52%	53	3.15%
1980	1,310	67.15%	607	31.11%	34	1.74%
1984	1,473	78.60%	392	20.92%	9	0.48%
1988	1,219	67.05%	596	32.78%	3	0.17%
1992	918	49.76%	514	27.86%	413	22.38%
1996	984	54.21%	616	33.94%	215	11.85%
2000	1,246	75.33%	387	23.40%	21	1.27%
2004	1,314	83.48%	254	16.14%	6	0.38%
2008	1,119	76.96%	319	21.94%	16	1.10%
2012	985	76.77%	275	21.43%	23	1.79%
2016	1,049	75.79%	299	21.60%	36	2.60%
2020	1,247	82.91%	241	16.02%	16	1.06%
2024	1,195	86.03%	186	13.39%	8	0.58%

United States Senate election results for Crane County, Texas1
Year	Republican		Democratic		Third party(ies)	
Year	No.	%	No.	%	No.	%
2024	1,115	83.33%	196	14.65%	27	2.02%

United States Senate election results for Crane County, Texas2
Year	Republican		Democratic		Third party(ies)	
Year	No.	%	No.	%	No.	%
2020	1,213	82.01%	229	15.48%	37	2.50%

Texas Gubernatorial election results for Crane County
Year	Republican		Democratic		Third party(ies)	
Year	No.	%	No.	%	No.	%
2022	983	85.70%	150	13.08%	14	1.22%

== See also ==
- Recorded Texas Historic Landmarks in Crane County
