= Crane, Texas =

- City
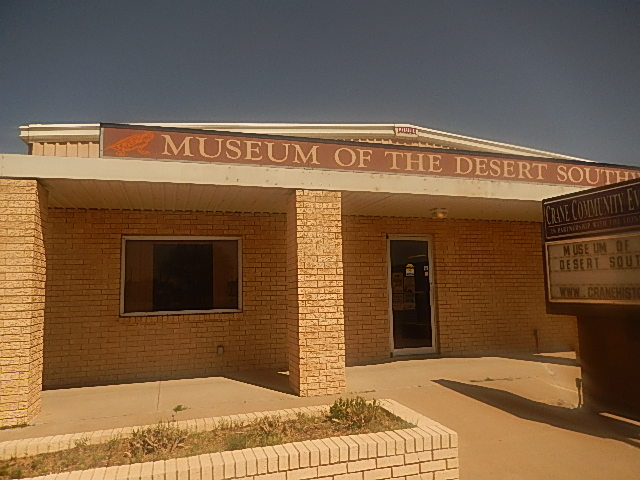
- Museum of the Desert Southwest

- Location of Crane, Texas
- Coordinates: 31°23′35″N 102°21′3″W
- Country: United States
- State: Texas
- County: Crane

Area
  - Total: 1.03 sq mi (2.68 km^{2})
  - Land: 1.03 sq mi (2.68 km^{2})
  - Water: 0 sq mi (0.00 km^{2})
- Elevation: 2,575 ft (785 m)

Population (2020)
  - Total: 3,478
  - Density: 3,360/sq mi (1,300/km^{2})
- Time zone: UTC-6 (Central (CST))
  - Summer (DST): UTC-5 (CDT)
- ZIP code: 79731
- Area code: 432
- FIPS code: 48-17516
- GNIS feature ID: 1355307
- Website: cityofcranetexas.com

Crane is a city in and the county seat of Crane County, Texas, United States. Its population was 3,478 as of 2020. An oil boomtown since the 1920s, Crane is still in the center of a prominent oil-producing region. It is the only significant town in sparsely populated Crane County, and contains the only post office in the county.

== History ==
While the post office dates from 1908, the discovery of oil in 1926 in the Permian Basin brought in enough fortune-seekers to populate a town. Streets are named for the children of O.C. Kinnison, the realtor who drew up the town map. By 1930, Crane was a full-fledged boomtown, with churches and private businesses operating next to the more nefarious elements of frontier life. As in other oil boomtowns, development of services lagged behind temporary dwellings for the workers, although paved roads and other basic infrastructure were added following incorporation in the early 1930s.

Peak population as reported by the U.S. Census was in 1960 at 3,796, and it has declined slightly since, although the town remains the center for serving the oil fields in Crane County.

The Museum of the Desert Southwest, the area's museum of local history, is operated by the Crane County Historical Commission.

== Geography ==
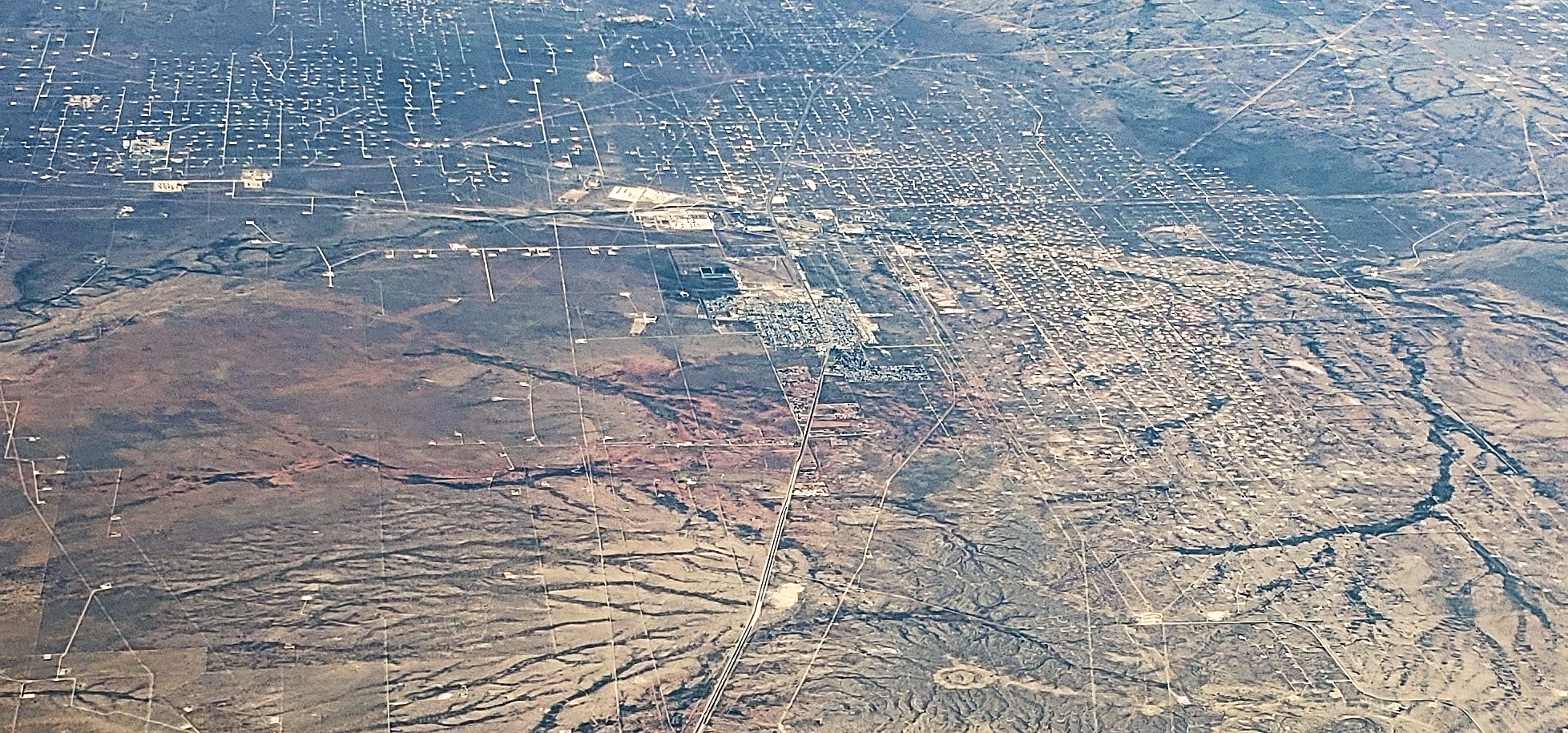
Aerial photo of Crane, Texas

Crane is located in eastern Crane County at 31°23′35″N 102°21′3″W (31.392949, –102.350751). According to the United States Census Bureau, the city has a total area of 1.0 square mile (2.7 km^{2}), all land.

The main highway through Crane is U.S. Route 385, which leads north 32 miles (51 km) to Odessa and south 21 miles (34 km) to McCamey.

=== Climate ===
As is typical for the region, Crane has a hot semiarid climate (Köppen BSh) with hot to sweltering summers with occasional thunderstorms and pleasant, dry winters with cold to freezing mornings.

Climate data for Crane, Texas, 1991–2020 normals, extremes 1929–present
Month	Jan	Feb	Mar	Apr	May	Jun	Jul	Aug	Sep	Oct	Nov	Dec	Year
Record high °F (°C)	88 (31)	93 (34)	96 (36)	104 (40)	110 (43)	115 (46)	111 (44)	111 (44)	109 (43)	103 (39)	91 (33)	87 (31)	115 (46)
Mean maximum °F (°C)	78.8 (26.0)	83.7 (28.7)	89.7 (32.1)	96.2 (35.7)	101.6 (38.7)	104.4 (40.2)	103.2 (39.6)	102.8 (39.3)	98.8 (37.1)	93.8 (34.3)	84.4 (29.1)	76.8 (24.9)	106.5 (41.4)
Mean daily maximum °F (°C)	60.0 (15.6)	64.8 (18.2)	72.7 (22.6)	82.0 (27.8)	88.8 (31.6)	94.8 (34.9)	95.4 (35.2)	95.2 (35.1)	88.2 (31.2)	80.2 (26.8)	68.6 (20.3)	60.2 (15.7)	79.2 (26.3)
Daily mean °F (°C)	46.1 (7.8)	50.1 (10.1)	59.0 (15.0)	67.3 (19.6)	75.8 (24.3)	82.8 (28.2)	84.2 (29.0)	83.9 (28.8)	76.2 (24.6)	67.5 (19.7)	55.7 (13.2)	46.6 (8.1)	66.3 (19.0)
Mean daily minimum °F (°C)	32.2 (0.1)	35.4 (1.9)	45.2 (7.3)	52.5 (11.4)	62.8 (17.1)	70.7 (21.5)	73.0 (22.8)	72.6 (22.6)	64.2 (17.9)	54.7 (12.6)	42.8 (6.0)	33.1 (0.6)	53.3 (11.8)
Mean minimum °F (°C)	18.8 (−7.3)	21.7 (−5.7)	27.8 (−2.3)	35.2 (1.8)	45.9 (7.7)	59.7 (15.4)	64.6 (18.1)	63.5 (17.5)	51.0 (10.6)	36.1 (2.3)	23.6 (−4.7)	20.7 (−6.3)	14.9 (−9.5)
Record low °F (°C)	−1 (−18)	−6 (−21)	12 (−11)	25 (−4)	26 (−3)	46 (8)	46 (8)	53 (12)	37 (3)	24 (−4)	8 (−13)	3 (−16)	−6 (−21)
Average precipitation inches (mm)	0.74 (19)	0.53 (13)	0.54 (14)	0.69 (18)	1.32 (34)	1.20 (30)	0.96 (24)	1.39 (35)	1.74 (44)	1.55 (39)	0.84 (21)	0.63 (16)	12.13 (307)
Average snowfall inches (cm)	0.6 (1.5)	0.1 (0.25)	0.0 (0.0)	0.0 (0.0)	0.0 (0.0)	0.0 (0.0)	0.0 (0.0)	0.0 (0.0)	0.0 (0.0)	0.0 (0.0)	0.1 (0.25)	1.2 (3.0)	2.0 (5.1)
Average precipitation days (≥ 0.01 in)	2.6	2.2	2.5	2.2	3.1	2.9	2.9	3.5	3.9	3.1	2.1	2.5	33.5
Average snowy days (≥ 0.1 in)	0.3	0.1	0.0	0.0	0.0	0.0	0.0	0.0	0.0	0.0	0.0	0.2	0.6
Source 1: NOAA
Source 2: National Weather Service

== Demographics ==
Historical population
Census	Pop.	Note	%±
1940	1,420		—
1950	2,154		51.7%
1960	3,796		76.2%
1970	3,427		−9.7%
1980	3,622		5.7%
1990	3,533		−2.5%
2000	3,191		−9.7%
2010	3,353		5.1%
2020	3,478		3.7%
U.S. Decennial Census

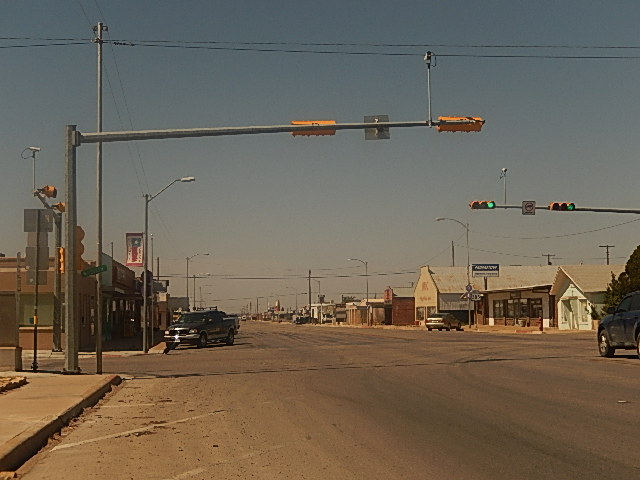
Downtown Crane

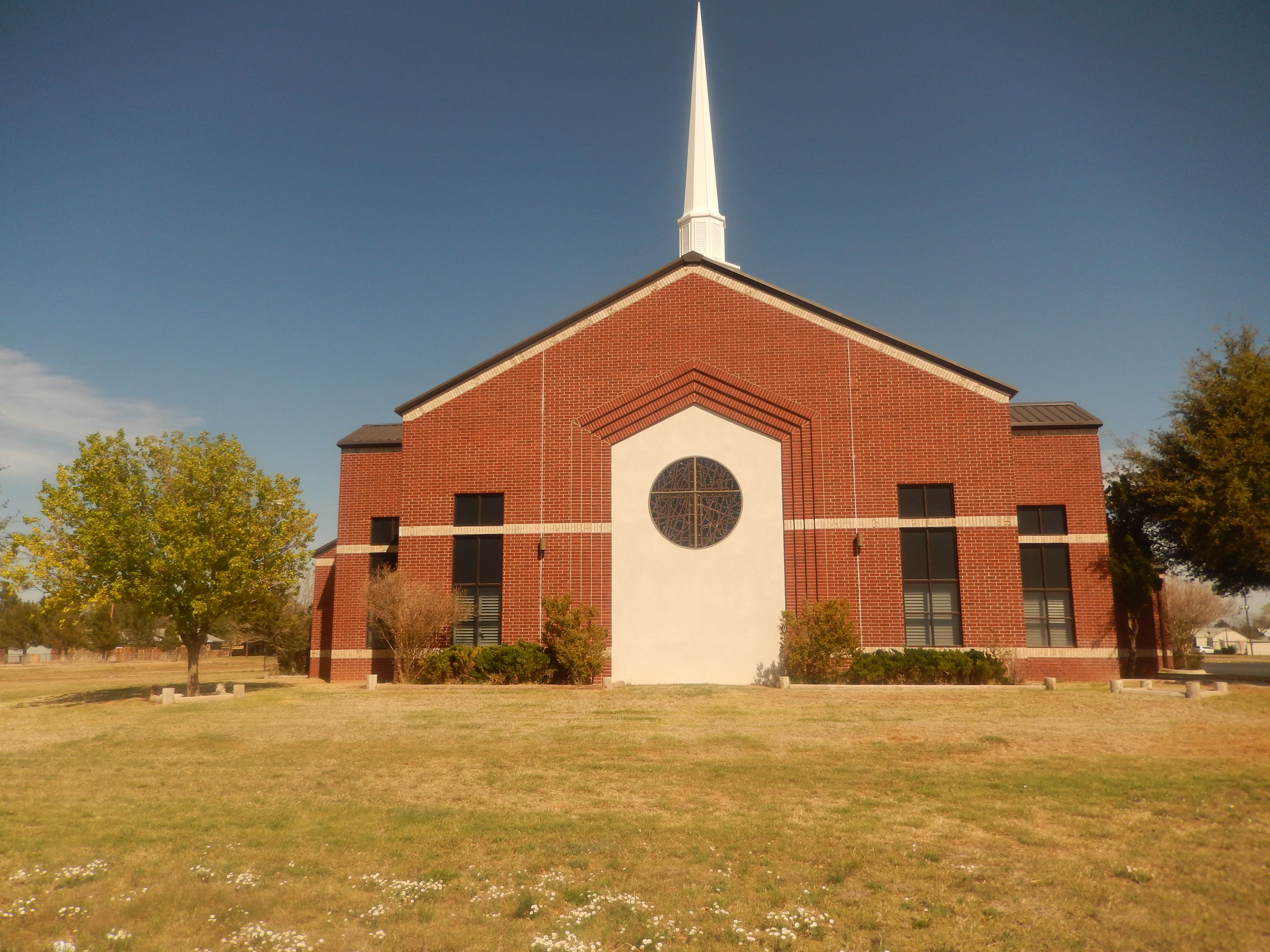
First Baptist Church at 101 E. 20th St. in Crane

=== 2020 census ===
As of the 2020 census, Crane had a population of 3,478 people living in 1,182 households and 826 families. The median age was 33.4 years; 29.6% of residents were under 18 and 12.1% were 65 or older. For every 100 females, there were 102.8 males, and for every 100 females 18 and over, there were 99.5 males 18 and over.

None of the residents lived in urban areas, while 100.0% lived in rural areas.

Of the households, 44.0% had children under 18 living in them, 57.4% were married-couple households, 16.0% were households with a male householder and no spouse or partner present, and 22.0% were households with a female householder and no spouse or partner present. About 20.5% of all households were made up of individuals, and 8.2% had someone living alone who was 65 or older.

The city had 1,376 housing units, of which 14.1% were vacant. The homeowner vacancy rate was 2.2% and the rental vacancy rate was 21.7%.

Racial composition as of the 2020 census
Race	Number	Percent
White	1,827	52.5%
Black or African American	72	2.1%
American Indian and Alaska Native	31	0.9%
Asian	14	0.4%
Native Hawaiian and other Pacific Islander	0	0.0%
Some other race	699	20.1%
Two or more races	835	24.0%
Hispanic or Latino (of any race)	2,367	68.1%

=== 2000 census ===
As of the census of 2000, 3,191 people, 1,096 households, and 865 families resided in the city. The population density was 3,129.7 inhabitants per square mile (1,208.4/km^{2}). The 1,278 housing units averaged 1,253.5 per square mile (483.8/km^{2}). The racial makeup of the city was 28.11% White, 3.01% African American, 0.97% Native American, 0.38% Asian, 19.43% from other races, and 2.70% from two or more races. Hispanics or Latinos were 45.41% of the population.

Of the 1,096 households, 43.8% had children under 18 living with them, 66.0% were married couples living together, 8.9% had a female householder with no husband present, and 21.0% were not families. About 19.3% of all households were made up of individuals, and 10.4% had someone living alone who was 65 or older. The average household size was 2.90. and the average family size was 3.35.

In the city, the agr distributton was 32.6% under 18, 7.8% from 18 to 24, 27.4% from 25 to 44, 21.5% from 45 to 64, and 10.7% who were 65 or older. The median age was 33 years. For every 100 females, there were 93.3 males. For every 100 females 18 and over, there were 89.3 males.

The median income in the city for a household was $31,774 and for a family was $36,386. Males had a median income of $32,250 versus $18,086 for females. The per capita income for the city was $12,776. About 13.0% of families and 13.1% of the population were below the poverty line, including 15.1% of those under 18 and 8.0% of those 65 or over.

== Education ==
The city is served by the Crane Independent School District and is home to the Crane High School Golden Cranes.

== Transportation ==
=== Intercity bus ===
Crane is served by All Aboard America!'s twice daily route between Midland International Air and Space Port and Presidio, with intermediate stops at Odessa, McCamey, Ft. Stockton, Alpine, and Marfa.

== Notable people ==
- Kip Averitt, Republican former state senator
- Elmer Kelton, Western novelist
- Kenny Wayne Walker (born 1967), former defensive lineman for the Denver Broncos; first deaf player to have played in the Canadian Football League, and one of only five to have played in the National Football League
