= Political fiction =

Literary genre

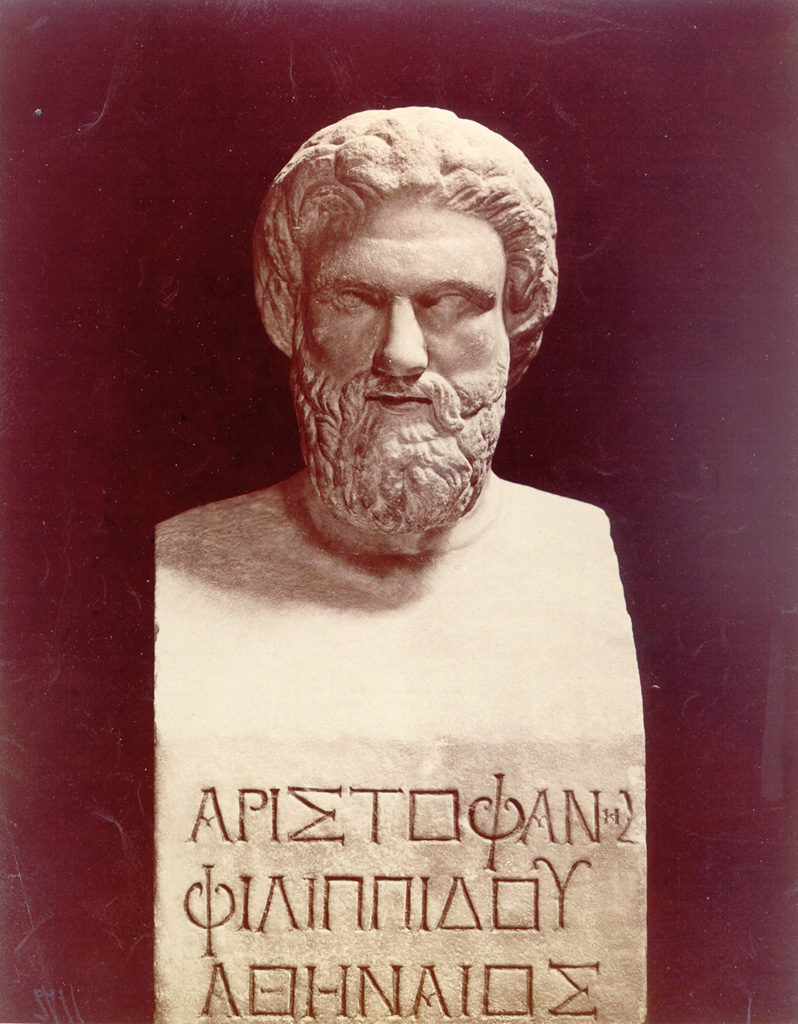
Aristophanes

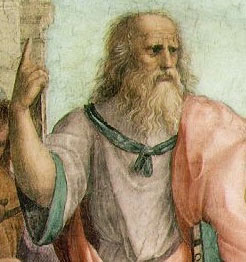
Plato

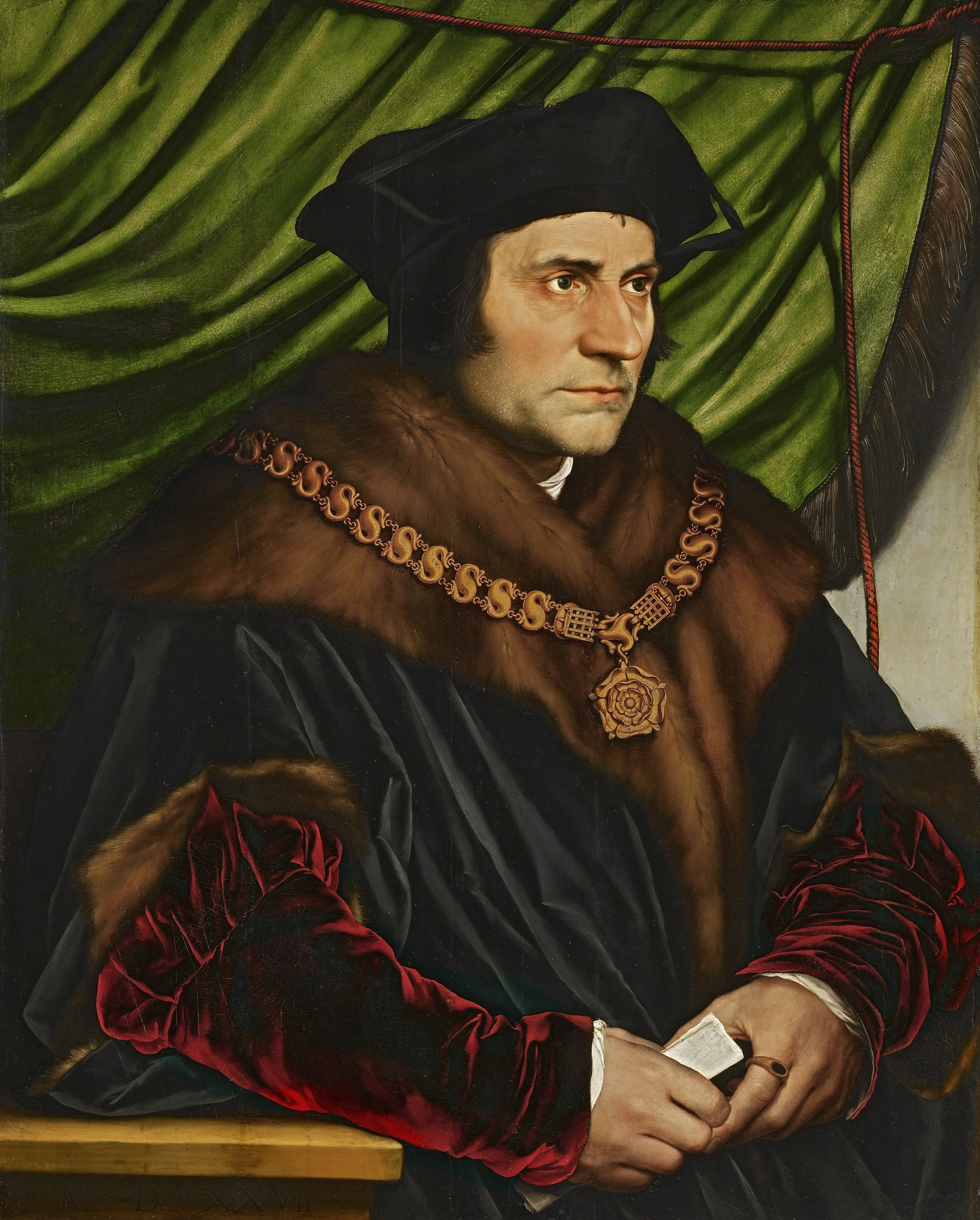
Thomas More

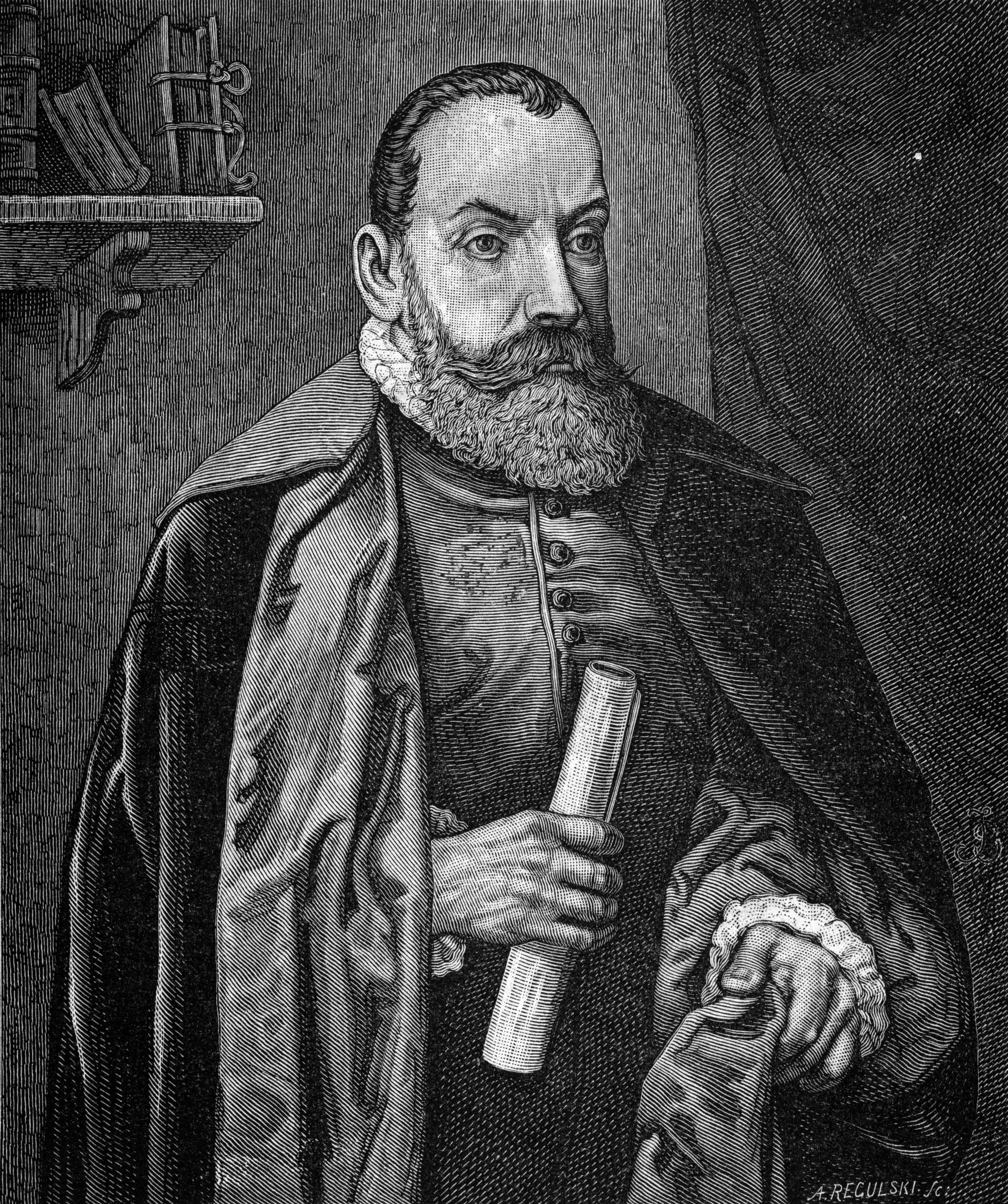
Jan Kochanowski

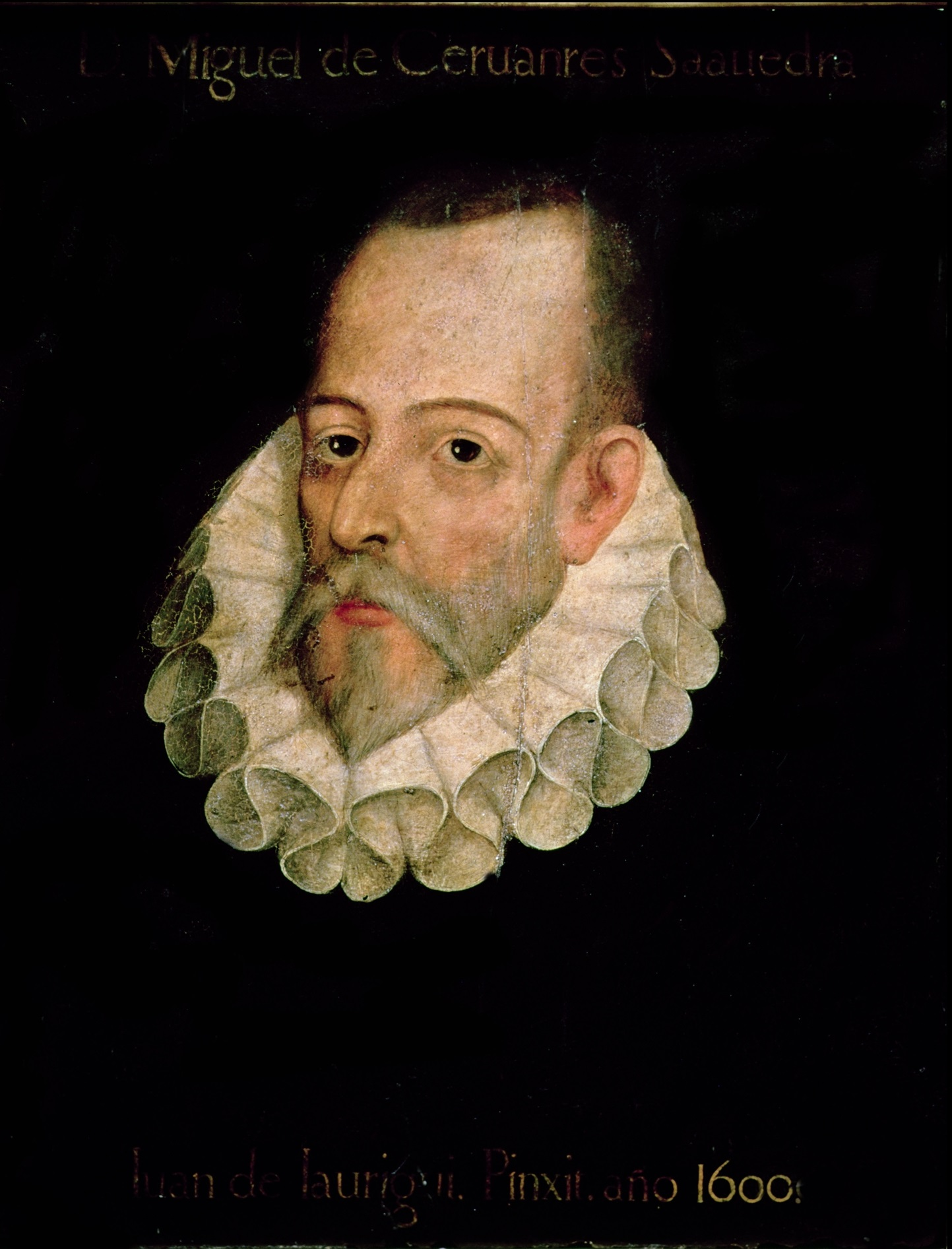
Miguel de Cervantes

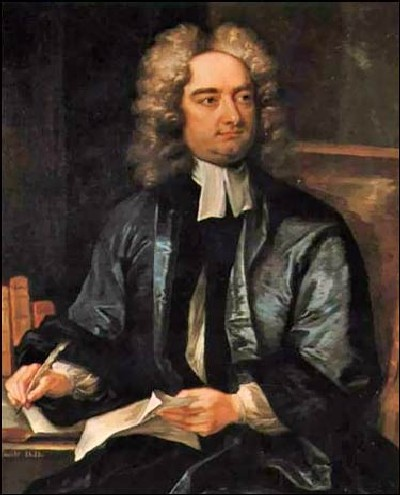
Jonathan Swift

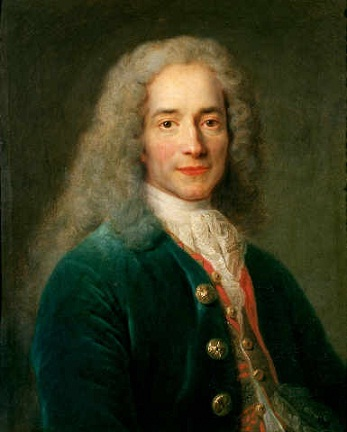
Voltaire

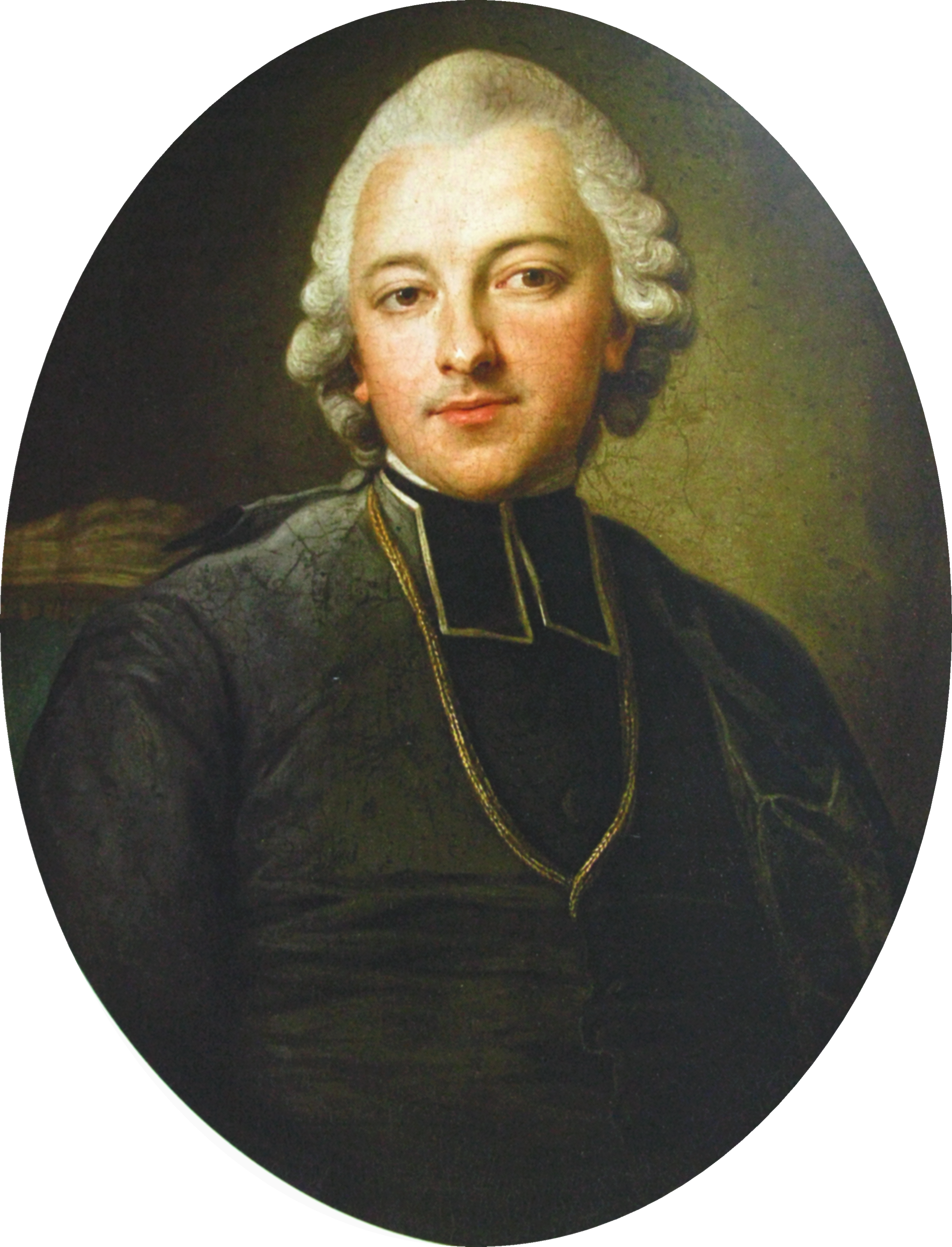
Ignacy Krasicki

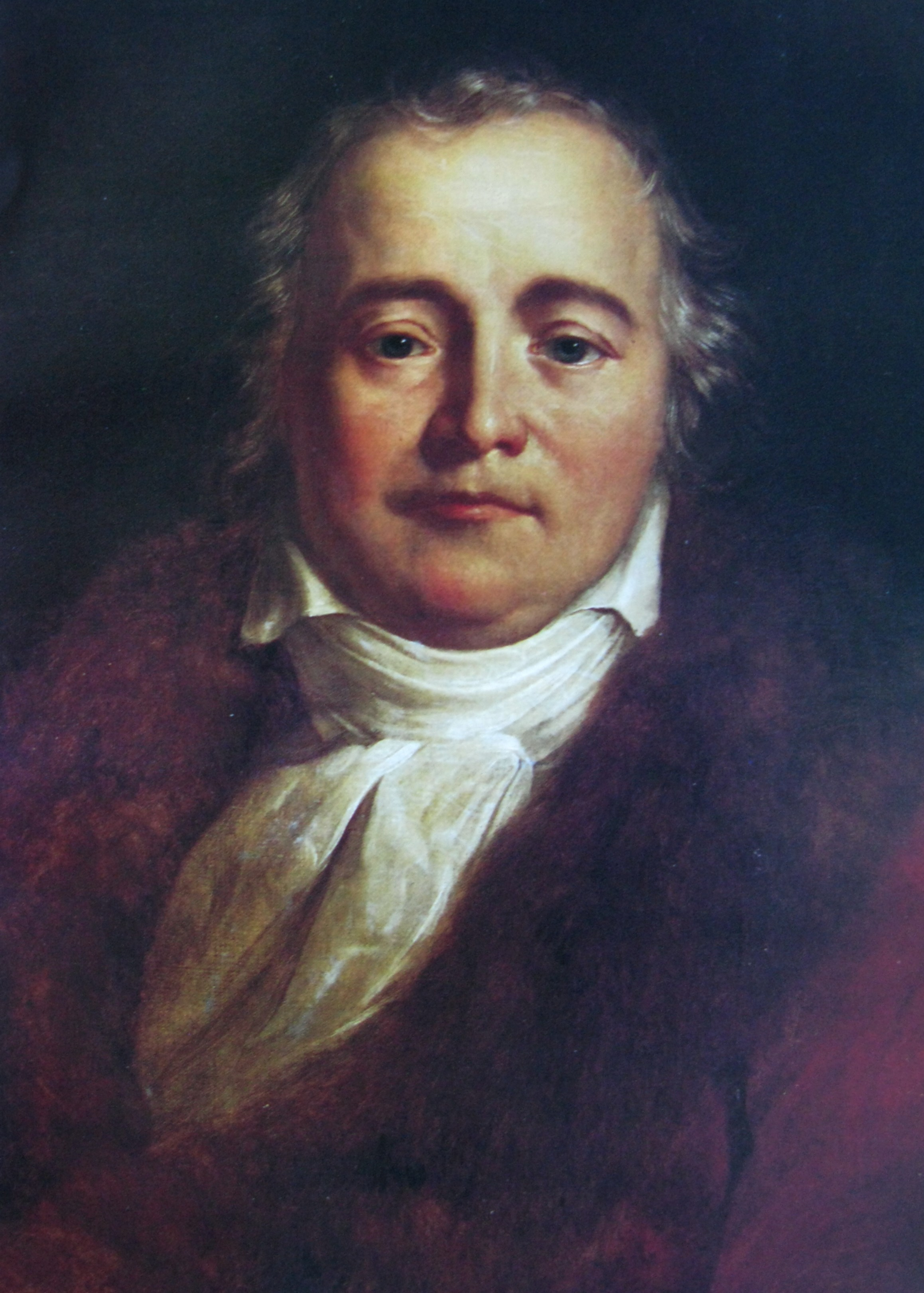
Julian Ursyn Niemcewicz

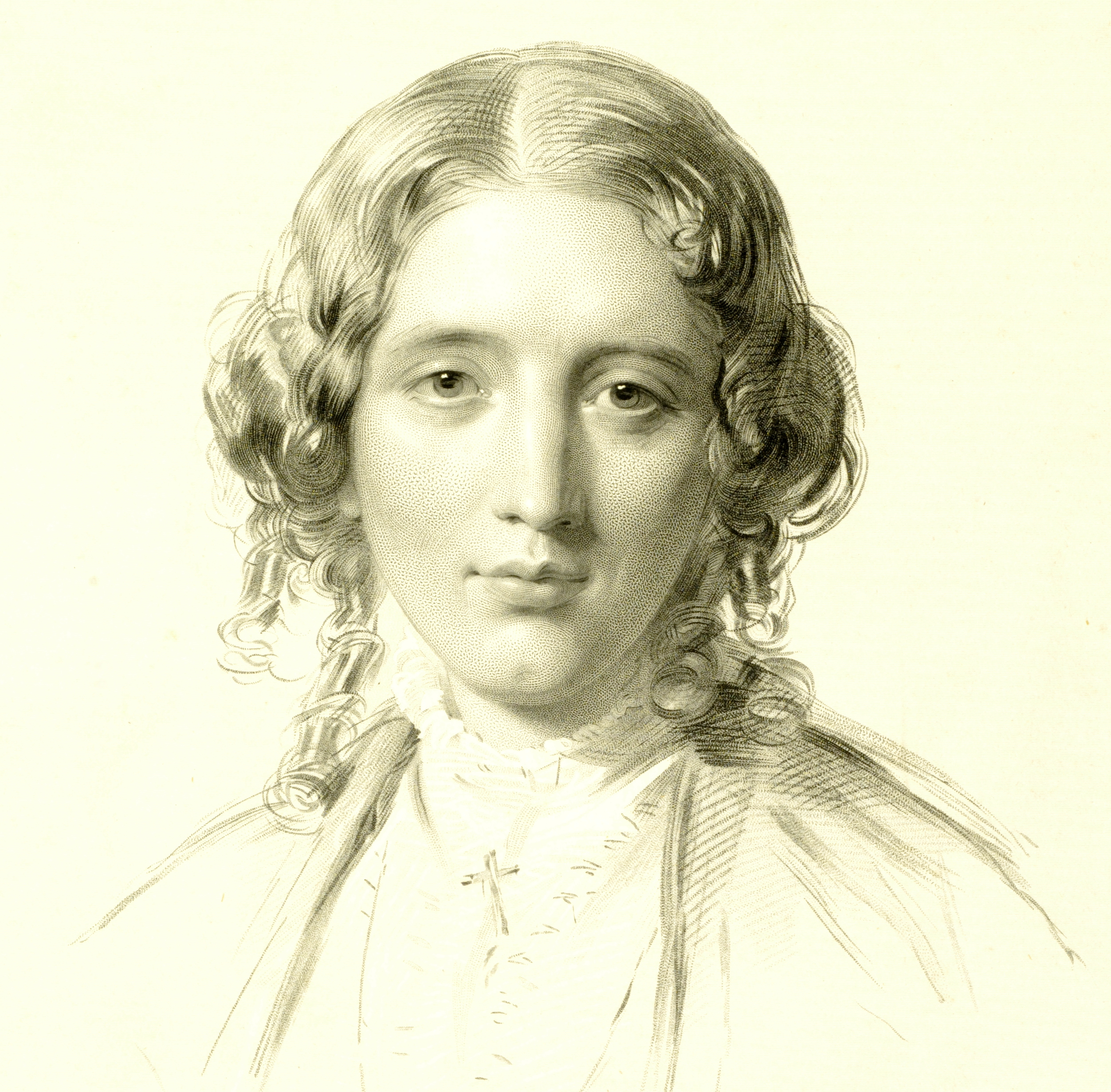
Harriet Beecher Stowe

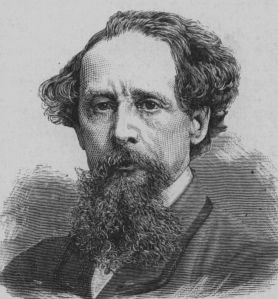
Charles Dickens

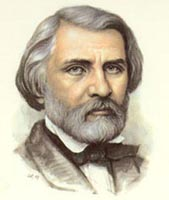
Ivan Turgenev

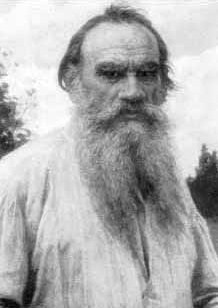
Leo Tolstoy

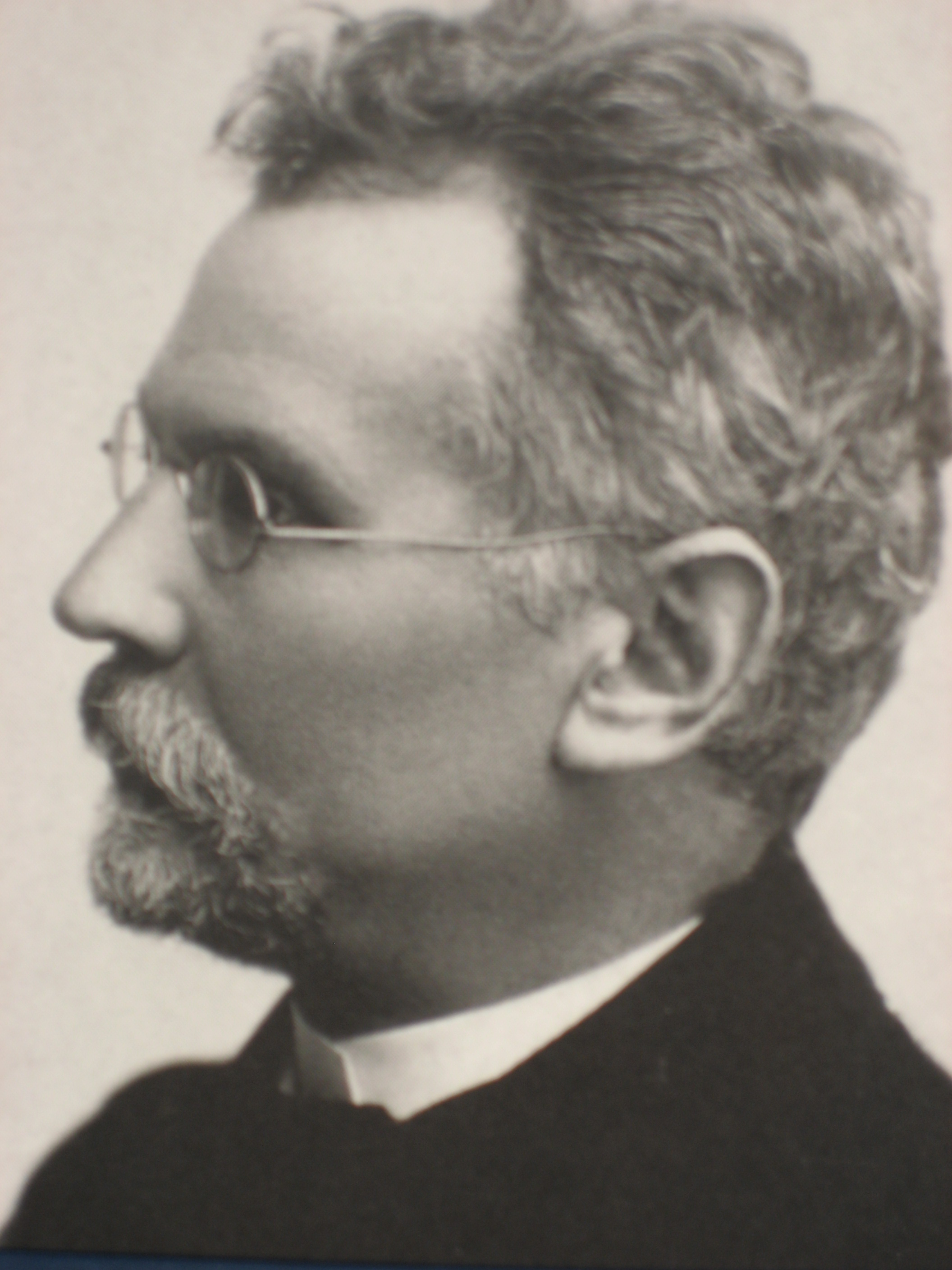
Bolesław Prus

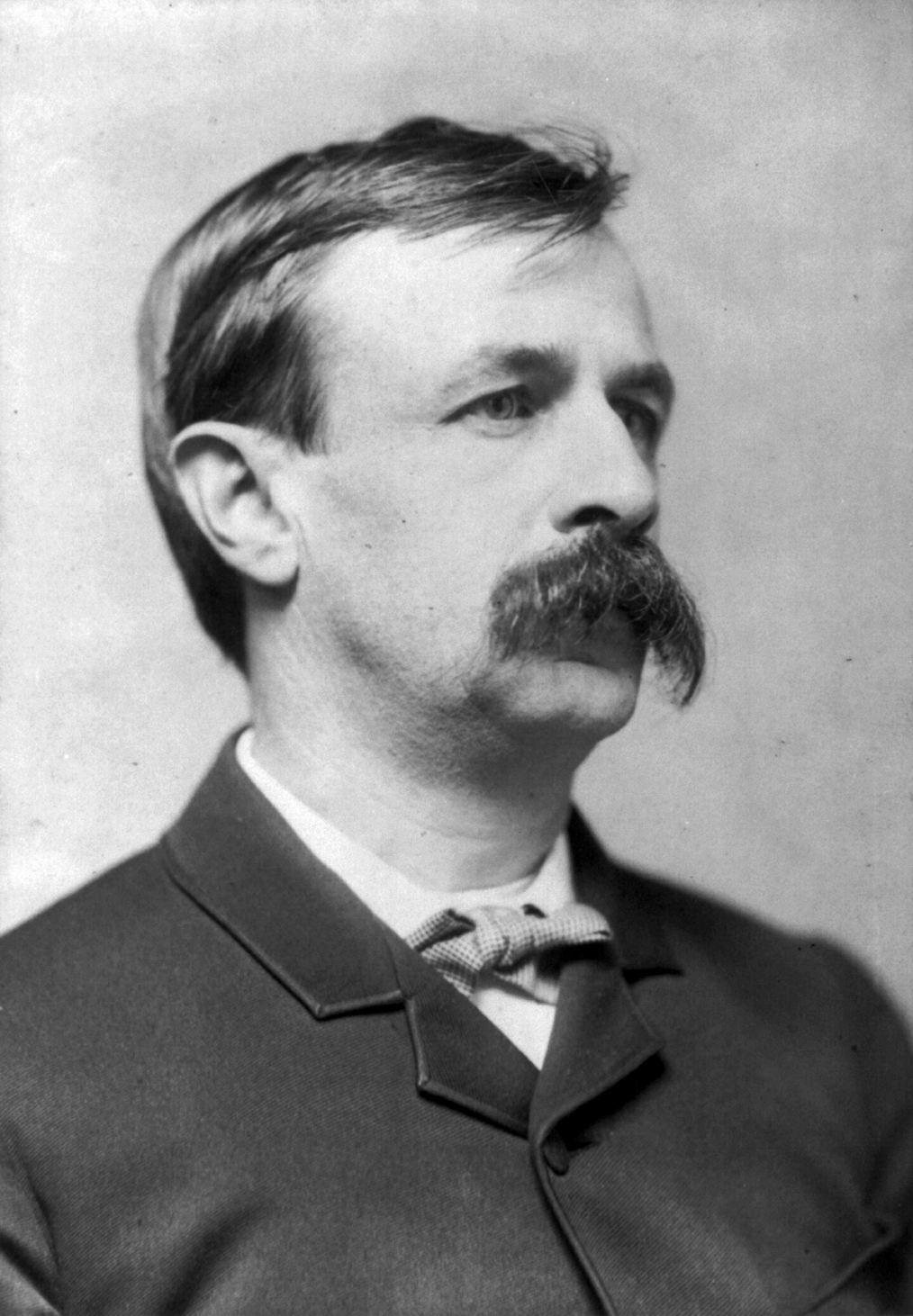
Edward Bellamy

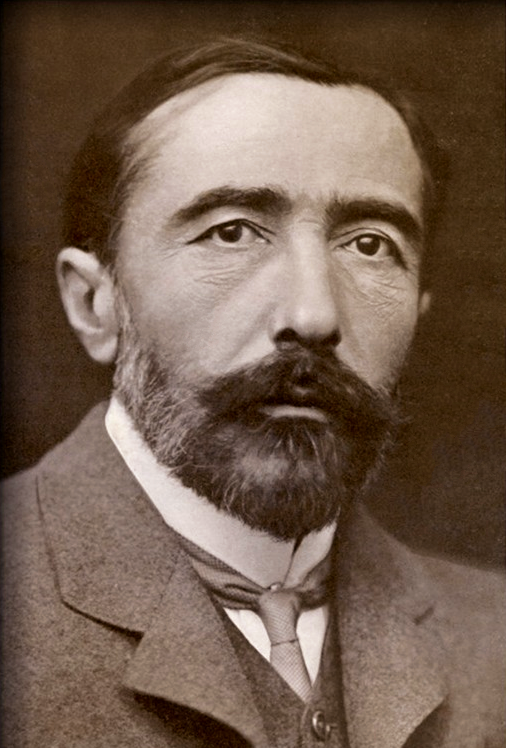
Joseph Conrad

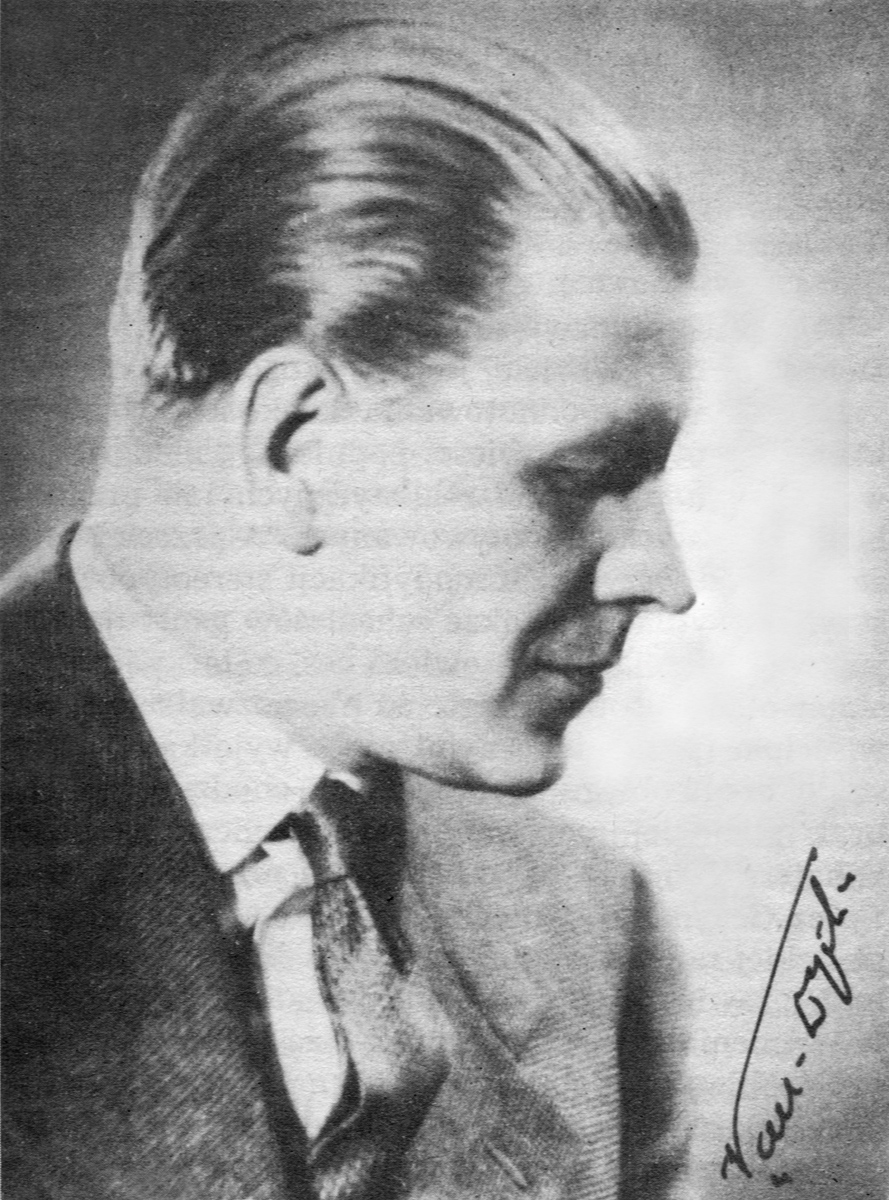
Tadeusz Dołęga-Mostowicz

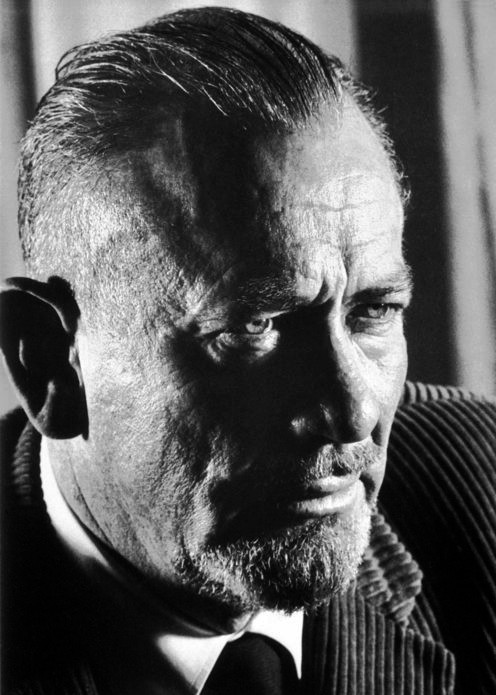
John Steinbeck

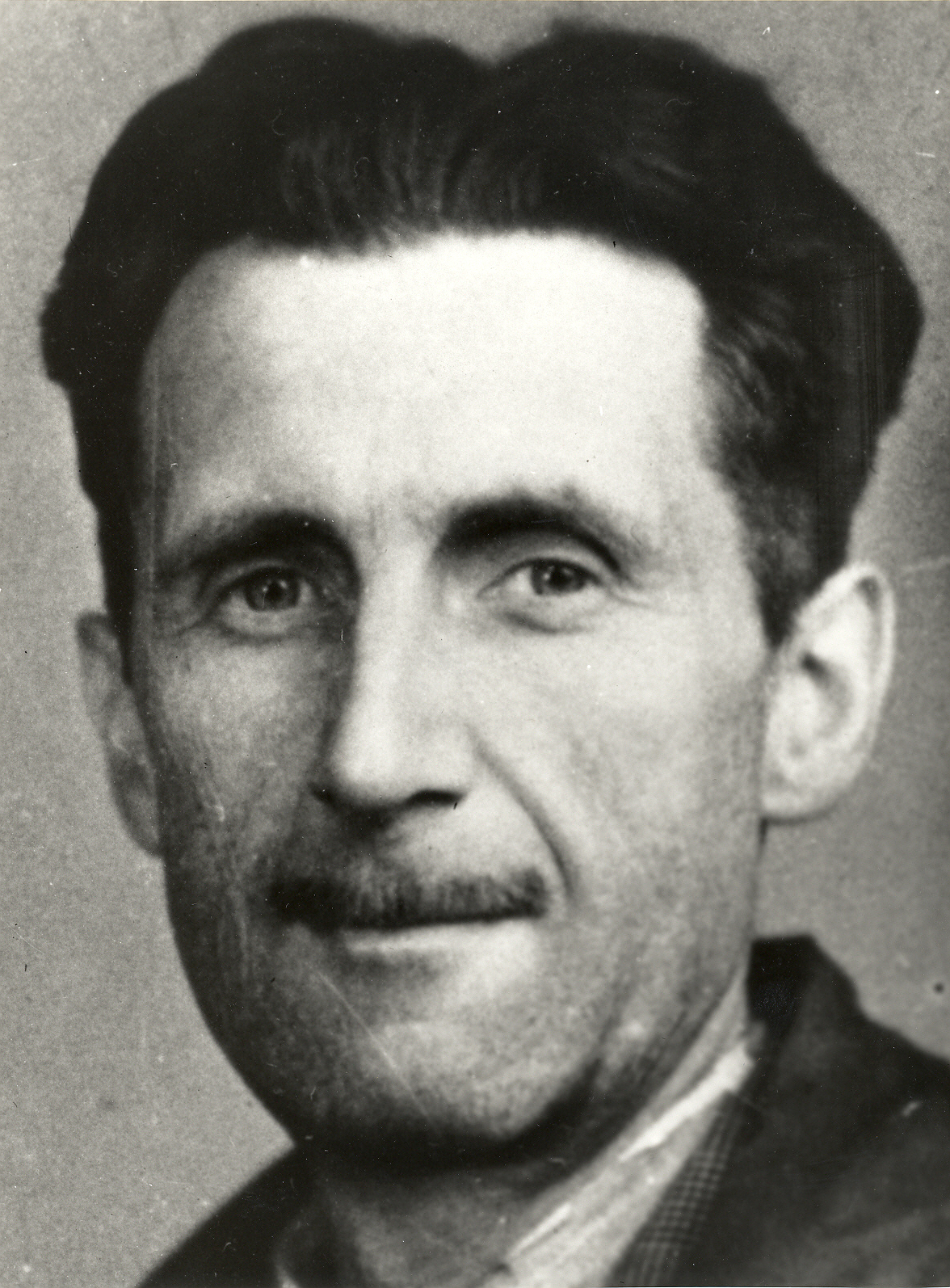
George Orwell

Political fiction employs narrative to comment on political events, systems and theories. Works of political fiction, such as political novels, often "directly criticize an existing society or present an alternative, even fantastic, reality". The political novel overlaps with the social novel, proletarian novel, and social science fiction.

Plato's Republic, a Socratic dialogue written around 380 BC, has been one of the world's most influential works of philosophy and political theory, both intellectually and historically. The Republic is concerned with justice (δικαιοσύνη), the order and character of the just city-state, and the just man. Other influential politically themed works include Thomas More's Utopia (1516), Jonathan Swift's Gulliver's Travels (1726), Voltaire's Candide (1759), and Harriet Beecher Stowe's Uncle Tom's Cabin (1852).

Political fiction frequently employs satire, often in the utopian and dystopian genres. This includes totalitarian dystopias of the early 20th century such as Jack London's The Iron Heel, Sinclair Lewis' It Can't Happen Here, and George Orwell's Nineteen Eighty-Four.

== Political satire ==
The Greek playwright Aristophanes' plays are known for their political and social satire, particularly in his criticism of the powerful Athenian general, Cleon, in plays such as The Knights. Aristophanes is also notable for the persecution he underwent. Aristophanes' plays turned upon images of filth and disease. His bawdy style was adopted by Greek dramatist-comedian Menander, whose early play, Drunkenness, contains an attack on the politician, Callimedon.

Jonathan Swift's A Modest Proposal (1729) is an 18th-century Juvenalian satirical essay in which he suggests that the impoverished Irish might ease their economic troubles by selling their children as food for rich gentlemen and ladies. The satirical hyperbole mocks heartless attitudes towards the poor, as well as British policy toward the Irish in general.

George Orwell's Animal Farm (1945) is an allegorical and dystopian novella which satirises the Russian Revolution of 1917 and the Soviet Union's Stalinist era. Orwell, a democratic socialist, was a critic of Joseph Stalin and was hostile to Moscow-directed Stalinism—an attitude that had been shaped by his experiences during the Spanish Civil War. The Soviet Union, he believed, had become a brutal dictatorship, built upon a cult of personality and enforced by a reign of terror. Orwell described his Animal Farm as "a satirical tale against Stalin", and in his essay "Why I Write" (1946) he wrote that Animal Farm was the first book in which he tried, with full consciousness of what he was doing, "to fuse political purpose and artistic purpose into one whole."

Orwell's most famous work, however, is Nineteen Eighty-Four (published in 1949), many of whose terms and concepts, such as Big Brother, doublethink, thoughtcrime, Newspeak, Room 101, telescreen, 2 + 2 = 5, and memory hole, have entered into common use. Nineteen Eighty-Four popularised the adjective "Orwellian", which describes official deception, secret surveillance, and manipulation of recorded history by a totalitarian or authoritarian state.

== 16th-century novel ==
The poet Jan Kochanowski's play The Dismissal of the Greek Envoys (1578), the first tragedy written in the Polish language, recounts an incident leading up to the Trojan War. Its theme of the responsibilities of statesmanship resonates to the present day.

The book Utopia (1516), written by Sir Thomas More, talk about a story of a different world compared to the one they live in. The character Thomas More is sent by King Henry VIII of England to negotiate the English wool trade. There he meets a man by the name Raphael Hythloday. He is a man that has been to the island on Utopia. He explains to More how their entire philosophy is to find happiness and share everything collectively; in this society, money does not exist, which starkly contrasts with the ascendant commercial empires in Thomas More's Europe.

== 18th-century novel ==
The political comedy The Return of the Deputy (1790), by Julian Ursyn Niemcewicz—Polish poet, playwright, statesman, and comrade-in-arms of Tadeusz Kościuszko—was written in about two weeks' time while Niemcewicz was serving as a deputy to the historic Four-Year Sejm of 1788–92. The comedy's premiere in January 1791 was an enormous success, sparking widespread debate, royal communiques, and diplomatic correspondence. As Niemcewicz had hoped, it set the stage for passage of Poland's epochal Constitution of 3 May 1791, which is regarded as Europe's first, and the world's second, modern written national constitution, after the United States Constitution implemented in 1789. The comedy pits proponents against opponents of political reforms: of abolishing the destabilizing free election of Poland's kings; of abolishing the legislatively destructive liberum veto; of granting greater rights to peasants and townspeople; of curbing the privileges of the mostly self-interested noble class; and of promoting a more active Polish role in international affairs, in the interest of stopping the depredations of Poland's neighbors, Russia, Prussia, and Austria (who will in 1795 complete the dismemberment of the Polish–Lithuanian Commonwealth). Romantic interest is provided by a rivalry between a reformer and a conservative for a young lady's hand—which is won by the proponent of reforms.

== 19th-century novel ==
An early example of the political novel is The Betrothed (1827) by Alessandro Manzoni, an Italian historical novel. Set in northern Italy in 1628, during the oppressive years of direct Spanish rule, it has been seen sometimes as a veiled attack on the Austrian Empire, which controlled Italy at the time the novel was written. It has been called the most famous and widely read novel in the Italian language.

In the 1840s British politician Benjamin Disraeli wrote a trilogy of novels with political themes. With Coningsby; or, The New Generation (1844), Disraeli, in historian Robert Blake's view, "infused the novel genre with political sensibility, espousing the belief that England's future as a world power depended not on the complacent old guard, but on youthful, idealistic politicians." Coningsby was followed by Sybil; or, The Two Nations (1845), another political novel, which was less idealistic and more clear-eyed than Coningsby; the "two nations" of its subtitle referred to the huge economic and social gap between the privileged few and the deprived working classes. The last of Disraeli's political-novel trilogy, Tancred; or, The New Crusade (1847), promoted the Church of England's role in reviving Britain's flagging spirituality.

Ivan Turgenev wrote Fathers and Sons (1862) as a response to the growing cultural schism that he saw between Russia's liberals of the 1830s and 1840s, and the growing Russian nihilist movement among their sons. Both the nihilists and the 1830s liberals sought Western-based social change in Russia. Additionally, these two modes of thought were contrasted with the Slavophiles, who believed that Russia's path lay in its traditional spirituality. Turgenev's novel was responsible for popularizing the use of the term "nihilism", which became widely used after the novel was published.

The Polish writer Bolesław Prus' novel, Pharaoh (1895), is set in the Egypt of 1087–85 BCE as that country experiences internal stresses and external threats that will culminate in the fall of its Twentieth Dynasty and New Kingdom. The young protagonist Ramses learns that those who would challenge the powers that be are vulnerable to co-option, seduction, subornation, defamation, intimidation, and assassination. Perhaps the chief lesson, belatedly absorbed by Ramses as pharaoh, is the importance, to power, of knowledge. Prus' vision of the fall of an ancient civilization derives some of its power from the author's intimate awareness of the final demise of the Polish–Lithuanian Commonwealth in 1795, a century before he completed Pharaoh. This is a political awareness that Prus shared with his 10-years-junior novelist compatriot, Joseph Conrad, who was an admirer of Prus' writings. Pharaoh has been translated into 23 languages and adapted as a 1966 Polish feature film. It is also known to have been Joseph Stalin's favourite book.

== 20th-century novel ==
Joseph Conrad wrote several novels with political themes: Nostromo (1904), The Secret Agent (1907), and Under Western Eyes (1911). Nostromo (1904) is set amid political upheaval in the fictitious South American country of Costaguana, where a trusted Italian-descended longshoreman, Giovanni Battista Fidanza—the novel's eponymous "Nostromo" (Italian for "our man")—is instructed by English-descended silver-mine owner Charles Gould to take Gould's silver abroad so that it will not fall into the hands of revolutionaries. The role of politics is paramount in The Secret Agent, as the main character, Verloc, works for a quasi-political organisation. The plot to destroy Greenwich Observatory is in itself anarchistic. Vladimir asserts that the bombing "must be purely destructive" and that the anarchists who will be implicated as the architects of the explosion "should make it clear that [they] are perfectly determined to make a clean sweep of the whole social creation." However, the political form of anarchism is ultimately controlled in the novel: the only supposed politically motivated act is orchestrated by a secret government agency. Conrad's third political novel, Under Western Eyes, is connected to Russian history. Its first audience read it against the backdrop of the failed Revolution of 1905 and in the shadow of the movements and impulses that would take shape as the revolutions of 1917. Conrad's earlier novella, Heart of Darkness (1899), also had political implications, in its depiction of European colonial depredations in Africa, which Conrad witnessed during his employ in the Belgian Congo.

John Steinbeck's novel The Grapes of Wrath (1939) is a depiction of the plight of the poor. However, some of Steinbeck's contemporaries attacked his social and political views. Bryan Cordyack writes: "Steinbeck was attacked as a propagandist and a socialist from both the left and the right of the political spectrum. The most fervent of these attacks came from the Associated Farmers of California; they were displeased with the book's depiction of California farmers' attitudes and conduct toward the migrants. They denounced the book as a 'pack of lies' and labeled it 'communist propaganda'". Some accused Steinbeck of exaggerating camp conditions to make a political point. Steinbeck had visited the camps well before publication of the novel and argued that their inhumane nature destroyed the settlers' spirit.

The Quiet American (1955) by English novelist Graham Greene questions the foundations of growing American involvement in Vietnam in the 1950s. The novel has received much attention due to its prediction of the outcome of the Vietnam War and subsequent American foreign policy since the 1950s. Graham Greene portrays a U.S. official named Pyle as so blinded by American exceptionalism that he cannot see the calamities he brings upon the Vietnamese. The book uses Greene's experiences as a war correspondent for The Times and Le Figaro in French Indochina in 1951–54.

The Gay Place (1961) is a set of politically themed novellas with interlocking plots and characters by American author Billy Lee Brammer. Set in an unnamed state identical to Texas, each novella has a different protagonist: Roy Sherwood, a member of the state legislature; Neil Christiansen, the state's junior senator; and Jay McGown, the governor's speech-writer. The governor himself, Arthur Fenstemaker, a master politician (said to have been based on Brammer's mentor Lyndon Johnson) serves as the dominant figure throughout. The book also includes characters based on Brammer, his wife Nadine, Johnson's wife Lady Bird, and his brother Sam Houston Johnson. The book has been widely acclaimed one of the best American political novels ever written.

== 21st-century novel ==
Since 2000, there has been a surge of Transatlantic migrant literature in French, Spanish, and English, with new narratives about political topics relating to global debt, labor abuses, mass migration, and environmental crises in the Global South. Political fiction by contemporary novelists from the Caribbean, Sub-Saharan Africa, and Latin America directly challenges political leadership, systemic racism, and economical systems. Fatou Diome, a Senegalese immigrant living France since the 1990s, writes political fiction about her experiences on France's unwelcoming borders that are dominated by white Christian culture. The work of Guadeloupean author Maryse Condé also tackles colonialism and oppression; her best known titles are Ségou (1984) and Ségou II (1985). Set in historical Segou (now part of Mali), the novels examine the violent legacies of the slave trade, Islam, Christianity, and colonization (from 1797 to 1860). A bold critic of the presidency of Nicolas Sarkozy, French novelist Marie Ndiayes won the Prix Goncourt for Three Strong Women (2009) about patriarchal control.

== Proletarian novel ==
The proletarian novel is written by workers, mainly for other workers. It overlaps and sometimes is synonymous with the working-class novel, socialist novel, social-problem novel (also problem novel, sociological novel, or social novel), propaganda or thesis novel, and socialist-realism novel. The intention of the writers of proletarian literature is to lift the workers from the slums by inspiring them to embrace the possibilities of social change or of a political revolution. As such, it is a form of political fiction.

The proletarian novel may comment on political events, systems, and theories, and is frequently seen as an instrument to promote social reform or political revolution among the working classes. Proletarian literature is created especially by communist, socialist, and anarchist authors. It is about the lives of the poor, and the period from 1930 to 1945, in particular, produced many such novels. However, proletarian works were also produced before and after those dates. In Britain, the terms "working-class" literature, novel, etc., are more generally used.

== Social novel ==
A closely related type of novel, which frequently has a political dimension, is the social novel – also known as the "social-problem" or "social-protest" novel – a "work of fiction in which a prevailing social problem, such as gender, race, or class prejudice, is dramatized through its effect on the characters of a novel". More specific examples of social problems that are addressed in such works include poverty, conditions in factories and mines, the plight of child labor, violence against women, rising criminality, and epidemics caused by overcrowding and poor sanitation in cities.

Charles Dickens was a fierce critic of the poverty and social stratification of Victorian society. Karl Marx asserted that Dickens "issued to the world more political and social truths than have been uttered by all the professional politicians, publicists and moralists put together". On the other hand, George Orwell, in his essay on Dickens, wrote: "There is no clear sign that he wants the existing order to be overthrown, or that he believes it would make very much difference if it were overthrown. For in reality his target is not so much society as 'human nature'."

Dickens's second novel, Oliver Twist (1839), shocked readers with its images of poverty and crime: it destroyed middle-class polemics about criminals, making any pretence to ignorance about what poverty entailed impossible. Dickens's Hard Times (1854) is set in a small Midlands industrial town and particularly criticizes the effect of Utilitarianism on the lives of cities' working classes. John Ruskin declared Hard Times his favourite Dickens work due to its exploration of important social questions. Walter Allen characterised Hard Times as an unsurpassed "critique of industrial society",

== Notable examples ==
Other notable examples are in the main lists, above.

- Panchatantra (c. 200 BCE) by Vishnu Sarma
- Water Margin (prototypes c. 1400 CE) attributed to Shi Nai'an
- Don Quixote (1605) by Miguel de Cervantes
- Simplicius Simplicissimus (1668) by Hans Jakob Christoffel von Grimmelshausen
- The Pilgrim's Progress (1678) by John Bunyan
- Persian Letters (1721) by Montesquieu
- The History and Adventures of an Atom (1769) by Tobias Smollett
- Fables and Parables (1779) by Ignacy Krasicki
- Dream of the Red Chamber (1791) by Cao Xueqin
- The Partisan Leader (1836) by Nathaniel Beverley Tucker
- Barnaby Rudge (1841) by Charles Dickens
- A Tale of Two Cities (1859) by Charles Dickens
- What Is to Be Done? (1863) by Nikolai Chernyshevsky
- The Palliser novels (1864–1879) by Anthony Trollope
- War and Peace (1869) by Leo Tolstoy
- The History of a Town (1870) by Mikhail Saltykov-Shchedrin
- Demons, also known as The Possessed or The Devils (1872), by Fyodor Dostoyevsky
- The Gilded Age (1876) by Mark Twain and Charles Dudley Warner
- Democracy: An American Novel (1880) by Henry Adams
- The Princess Casamassima (1886) by Henry James
- The Bostonians (1886) by Henry James
- Resurrection (1899) by Leo Tolstoy
- NEQUA or The Problem of the Ages (1900) Jack Adams
- The Old New Land (1902) by Theodor Herzl
- Mother (1906) by Maxim Gorky
- The Jungle (1906) by Upton Sinclair
- Petersburg (1913) by Andrei Bely
- The Ragged-Trousered Philanthropists (1914) by Robert Tressell
- Der Untertan (1914) by Heinrich Mann
- The Trial (1925) by Franz Kafka
- The Castle (1926) by Franz Kafka
- The Foundation Pit (1930) by Andrei Platonov
- The Career of Nicodemus Dyzma (1932) by Tadeusz Dołęga-Mostowicz
- Man's Fate (1933) by André Malraux
- Fontamara (1933) by Ignazio Silone
- It Can't Happen Here (1935) by Sinclair Lewis
- Darkness at Noon (1940) by Arthur Koestler
- Walden Two (1948) by B. F. Skinner
- Dark Green, Bright Red (1950) by Gore Vidal
- Atlas Shrugged (1957) by Ayn Rand
- The Manchurian Candidate (1959) by Richard Condon
- The Comedians (1966) by Graham Greene
- Cancer Ward (1967) by Aleksandr Solzhenitsyn
- Washington, D.C. (1967) by Gore Vidal
- Burr (1973) by Gore Vidal
- The Chocolate War (1974) by Robert Cormier
- Guerrillas (1975) by V. S. Naipaul
- Ragtime (1975) by E.L. Doctorow
- 1876 (1976) by Gore Vidal
- Vineland (1990) by Thomas Pynchon
- From the Fatherland with Love (2005) by Ryu Murakami
- Occupied (2015); The Little Voice (2016); Money Power Love (2017) by Joss Sheldon

=== Science fiction ===
- Brave New World (1932) by Aldous Huxley
- War with the Newts (1936) by Karel Čapek
- Starship Troopers (1959) by Robert A. Heinlein
- The Dispossessed: An Ambiguous Utopia (1974) by Ursula K. Le Guin
- The Mars trilogy (1990s) by Kim Stanley Robinson

== See also ==
- Augustan literature
- Political cartoon
- Political poetry
- Political satire
- Proletarian literature
