= Bud Shrake =

American writer (1931–2009)

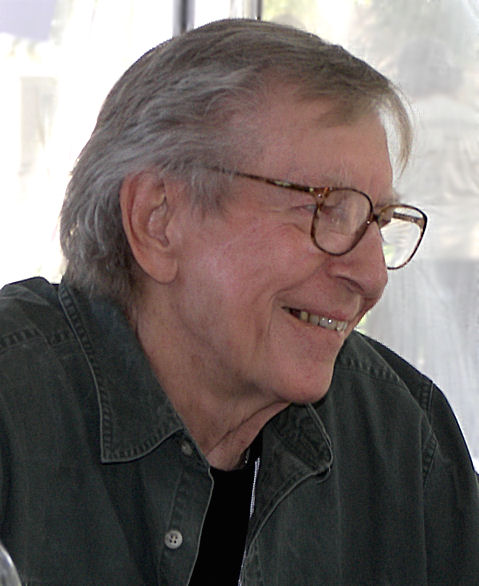
- Shrake at the 2007 Texas Book Festival
- Born: Edwin A. Shrake Jr. September 6, 1931; Fort Worth, Texas, U.S.
- Died: May 8, 2009 (aged 77)
- Education: R. L. Paschal High School; University of Texas at Austin; Texas Christian University
- Occupations: Journalist; sportswriter; novelist; biographer; screenwriter
- Spouse(s): Joyce Shrake; Doatsy Shrake
- Children: 2

Edwin A. "Bud" Shrake Jr. (September 6, 1931 – May 8, 2009) was an American journalist, sportswriter, novelist, biographer and screenwriter. He co-wrote a series of golfing advice books with golf coach Harvey Penick, including Harvey Penick's Little Red Book, a golf guide that became the best-selling sports book in publishing history. Called a "lion of Texas letters" by the Austin American-Statesman, Shrake was a member of the Texas Film Hall of Fame, and received the Lon Tinkle lifetime achievement award from the Texas Institute of Letters and the Texas Book Festival Bookend Award.

== Early life ==
Shrake was born in Fort Worth, Texas, and attended Paschal High School where, along with Dan Jenkins, he wrote for the school newspaper the Paschal Pantherette.

He served in the Army and attended the University of Texas at Austin and Texas Christian University.

In 1951, Shrake joined Jenkins at the Fort Worth Press while he completed his degree in English and philosophy at TCU. Shrake started on the police beat for the underdog Press while Gary Cartwright covered the same beat for the mainstream Fort Worth Star-Telegram. According to Cartwright, he and Shrake usually could be found hanging out at a bar across the street from the police station; a copy boy monitoring police calls would alert them to stories. Looking back at his job interview at the Press, Shrake would write “it was a rackety, dirty city paper, with the teletypes clacking and a sense of urgency everywhere. A copy editor was eating tuna fish out of a can, and the bowling writer was drinking bourbon, and I thought, 'This is the world I want to be in.' " At the Press, he also worked under legendary sports editor Blackie Sherrod who said about Shrake, “he immediately showed talent and went on to remarkable success and acclaim far beyond the pressbox."

In 1958, Shrake moved to the Dallas Times Herald as a sportswriter, followed by a move in 1961 to the Dallas Morning News in order to write a daily sports column.

Shrake wrote about the Comanche’s final battle against the United States Army in his first novel, Blood Reckoning (1962). But Not for Love, published in 1964, looked at the post-war generation.

== Sports Illustrated ==
In 1964, Shrake moved to New York City, following Jenkins, to join the staff of Sports Illustrated, where editor André Laguerre considered him a "literary" sportswriter. Accordingly, Laguerre often allowed Shrake to write "bonus pieces"—long feature stories sometimes barely related to sports. Among the notable feature articles Shrake wrote for Sports Illustrated are “The Once Forbidding Land” (1965), a profile of life in the Texas Hill Country, and The Tarahumaras: A Lonely Tribe of Long-Distance Runners (1967), which he wrote after spending several weeks with the Tarahumaras in Northern Mexico.

== Return to Texas ==
Shrake returned to Texas in 1968 and continued his association with Sports Illustrated until 1979 while also writing novels and screenplays. His 1968 book Blessed McGill, set during Reconstruction, is often cited as a classic of Texas fiction, as is his 1972 novel Strange Peaches. Strange Peaches is set in Dallas just before and after the Kennedy assassination. The novel's lead character is a TV Western star who quits his show and returns to Dallas to make a documentary. The book is based in part on Shrake's own life story: in November 1963, he was dating Jada, the star dancer at Jack Ruby’s Carousel Club. Strange Peaches includes Ruby as a supporting character, and borrows the real-life moment when Shrake, standing with his camera at Main and Houston, locked eyes with Kennedy.

In 1969, Shrake wrote what is perhaps his best-known article, "Land of the Permanent Wave", about a trip to the Big Thicket in East Texas, where he encounters environmental destruction, as well as xenophobia, bigotry and a sense of living in the past, exemplified by the permanent wave hairstyle still popular among women there. He intended the article for publication in Sports Illustrated, but it was rejected, possibly because an East Texas lumber company was a stockholder. It was instead published in the February 1970 issue of Harper's Magazine. Harper's editor Willie Morris later called it one of the two best pieces Morris ever published during his tenure at the magazine. Morris wrote that Shrake's story "struck a chord in me that I have never quite forgotten, having to do with how clean, funny, and lambent prose caught the mood of that moment in the country and mirrored with great felicity what we were trying to do at Harper's. To me few finer magazine essays have ever been written."

Shrake's acidic look at his home state continued in Peter Arbiter (1973), a retelling of Petronius’ Satyricon that compares oil-boom Texas to Rome’s decadence. In 1976 Shrake and Jenkins published Limo, a satiric look at network television executives struggling to produce “Just Up The Street,” a reality show showing four families live for three hours in prime-time.

== Mad Dog Inc. ==
During the 60s and 70s, Shrake, Jenkins, Cartwright (who would go on to write for Texas Monthly), Billy Lee Brammer (The Gay Place), Larry L. King ("The Best Little Whorehouse in Texas"), Peter Gent (North Dallas Forty) and Texas journalist/professor Jay Milner were part of a “ragtag assemblage” of Texas writers known as Mad Dog Inc. Jenkins would describe Shrake as "an easy writer, a fast writer, a creative writer." "We were into smoking and drinking and hanging out, like most writers in the old days," Jenkins said. "I think journalism was a stopover for him. But he was awfully good at it." Cartwright would later say that "[w]e were fairly wild, untamed, uncontrolled boys.” Shrake and Cartwright eventually incorporated a company named Mad Dog Productions. According to Shrake's archives, the company's motto was “doing indefinable services to mankind" (, and its only documented service was giving $1,000 to the Armadillo World Headquarters in 1970 to help it financially. Mad Dogs Shrake and Cartwright often subjected unsuspecting strangers to the antics of the Flying Punzars, an alleged circus act; they occasionally were joined in these antics by musician Jerry Jeff Walker.

Other Mad Dog antics included games of “naked bridge” at Dan and June Jenkins’ house in Fort Worth; a pissing contest between Shrake, Don Meredith, and George Plimpton held on the balcony of Shrake's third-floor apartment in New York; and a multi-day bender in Austin that saw Cartwright drop out after about 27 hours, Hunter S. Thompson folding some 10–12 hours later, and Shrake and Walker being still on the town on the morning of the fourth day. Shrake's Mad Dog adventures while on the Sports Illustrated staff include the time he hired Frank Sinatra to go to Europe to photograph a heavyweight boxing match — Sinatra received press credentials but missed his flight; the time he was saved from a mob by Mohammed Ali; the time a London soccer team elected him honorary captain after winning an important contest — Shrake led celebrating team members and supporters on a midnight parade; and the time he selected the Houston Oilers’ draft picks, choosing André Laguerre (his boss at Sports Illustrated) with the 25th pick.

== Screenplay writing ==
Shrake's screenplays include the thriller Nightwing (1979), Tom Horn (a Steve McQueen Western written in collaboration with Thomas McGuane; 1980), Kid Blue (an "acid Western" vehicle for Dennis Hopper; 1973) and Songwriter (1984), which starred Willie Nelson, Kris Kristofferson, and Rip Torn. Shrake's play "Pancho Villa's Wedding Day" (1983) started as a movie project with Hopper that never found funding. Nelson, Kristofferson and Torn would be reunited in two made-for-TV movies written by Shrake and Cartwright, Pair of Aces (1990) and Another Pair of Aces (1991). Shrake played a bit role in the latter; he had appeared in a “small, but significant” role as “Sodbuster Two” in Lonesome Dove.

== Later novels and biographies ==
Shrake began to write celebrity as-told-to biographies in the 1980s, beginning with his friend Willie Nelson, which was followed by a biography of Barry Switzer and four books with Penick. Shrake smoked, drank and used drugs until the mid-1980s, when a doctor told him he might live a year if he didn't stop. He quit in one day, and then wrote Night Never Falls just to see if he could do it without cigarettes and booze. Night Never Falls was published in 1987, and became his favorite of his novels. It featured foreign correspondent Harry Sparrow (a stand-in for Shrake) trapped with the French in Dien Bien Phu and was the only one of Shrake's novels not set in Texas.

The success of Harvey Penick's Little Red Book in 1992, and its sequels, left him financially stable, enabling him to pursue his fiction writing. Shrake returned to the Comanche, the subject of his first novel, in The Borderland: A Novel of Texas (2000). His 2001 Billy Boy is a coming-of-age story set in Fort Worth that features John L. Bredemus as a guardian angel, golf champ Ben Hogan, and several rounds at Colonial Country Club. Shrake's 10th novel, Custer's Brother's Horse (2007), is set in Texas in 1865 right after the Civil War ends.

Shrake's 2006 play The Friend of Carlos Monzon is based on the time he was briefly held in an Argentine prison during the 1970s while on assignment for Sports Illustrated.

== Critical reception ==
Blessed McGill, Strange Peaches and But Not for Love are ranked by literary scholars as among the best ever written about Texas." George Plimpton called Blessed McGill “[a]n absolutely first-rate account of the rambunctious life and times of the Reconstruction years in Texas—an enthralling era of derring-do which finds its perfect chronicler in Mr. Shrake.” United Press International’s review of Strange Peaches stated that it was “not only one of the best-written American novels since World War II, it entertains…a great book, not just for critics, but for readers.” Screenwriter and photographer Bill Wittliff said that Shrake “was one of those who took the raw material of our history and was making real literature of it. He was one of the greats with Larry McMurtry and Cormac McCarthy. We were fortunate indeed to have his voice." McMurtry himself said in 1981 that "Shrake has always been an intriguing talent, far superior to his drinking buddies.” University of Texas professor Don Graham, a leading critic of Texas literature, has said that whenever anyone asks him what Dallas was like about the time of the Kennedy assassination, he sends them to Strange Peaches.

In 2008, the University of Texas Press published Land of the Permanent Wave: An Edwin "Bud" Shrake Reader, an anthology named after Shrake's Harper's Magazine piece.

Shrake's personal papers and literary archive, dating to 1936, are stored at the Southwestern Writers Collection at Texas State University-San Marcos; a portion of the archive had been held by the Austin History Center

== Personal life ==
Shrake was twice married to and twice divorced from Joyce Shrake, with whom he had two sons, Ben Shrake of Fort Worth and Alan Shrake of Los Angeles. His marriage to Doatsy Shrake also ended in divorce. His survivors also include his brother, Bruce, of Houston, four grandchildren, and three great-grandchildren. Shrake was Texas Governor Ann Richards' companion for 17 years, until her death in 2006. ("We always said we'd get married when we were older," Shrake said in 2007.) As the "first gentleman of Texas," he escorted Richards to her inaugural ball and to other social events, and organized card games inside the Texas governor's mansion. Shrake was raised in Fort Worth's Travis Avenue Baptist Church, but that did not stop him from obtaining ordination by the Universal Life Church and officiating at the wedding of friends such as Cartwright.

== Illness and death ==
Shrake suffered from both prostate cancer and lung cancer in his final years. At a Southwestern Writers Collection event in 2008, Shrake urged friends to heed Johnny Mercer's lyrics: "You've got to accentuate the positive. Eliminate the negative. Latch on the affirmative. Don't mess with Mister In-Between." Despite his advanced lung cancer, Shrake made an appearance on April 8, 2009, at a special screening of Songwriter in Austin. He was roughly 100 pages into a new novel when he died.

Shrake died at St. David's Hospital in Austin, of complications from lung cancer. The staff at the Austin Country Club lowered its club flag to half staff in recognition of Shrake's death. At Shrake's funeral, Ray Benson sang Willie Nelson's "I Still Can't Believe You're Gone" while Nelson sang "Angel Flying Too Close to the Ground" and Cartwright called Shrake "my friend, compadre and mentor for 50 years. Every success I enjoyed owed directly or indirectly to Bud Shrake." At the graveside service, Jerry Jeff Walker played two songs: Charles John Quarto and Shake Russell's "Dare of an Angel" and the Walter Donaldson and Gus Kahn standard "My Buddy." Shrake's hearse bore the Mad Dog Productions sign in the back window.

Shrake is buried next to Ann Richards in the Texas State Cemetery.

== Bibliography ==
=== Fiction ===
- Blood Reckoning (1962)
- But Not for Love (1964)
- Blessed McGill (1968)
- Strange Peaches (1972)
- Peter Arbiter (1973)
- Limo (1976, with Dan Jenkins)
- Night Never Falls (1987)
- The Borderland: A Novel of Texas (2000)
- Billy Boy (2001)
- Custer's Brother's Horse (2007)
- Hollywood Mad Dogs (2020, posthumously)

=== Nonfiction ===
- Willie: An Autobiography (1988)
- Bootlegger's Boy (1990)
- Harvey Penick's Little Red Book [with Harvey Penick] (1992)
- And If You Play Golf, You're My Friend [with Harvey Penick] (1993)
- For All Who Love the Game: Lessons and Teachings for Women [with Harvey Penick] (1995)
- The Game for a Lifetime: More Lessons and Teachings [with Harvey Penick] (1996)
- The Wisdom of Harvey Penick [with Harvey Penick] (1997)

=== Anthology ===
- Land of the Permanent Wave: An Edwin "Bud" Shrake Reader [Steven L. Davis, editor] (2008)

== Filmography ==
- J. W. Coop (1971) (writer) (as Edwin Shrake)
- Kid Blue (1973) (written by) (as Edwin Shrake)
- Nightwing (1979) (screenplay)
- Tom Horn (1980) (screenplay)
- Songwriter (1984) (writer)
- Pair of Aces (1990) (TV) (co-written with Gary Cartwright)
- Another Pair of Aces: Three of a Kind (1991) (TV) (co-written with Gary Cartwright)
