= Peter Gent =

American football player and author (1942–2011)

- Peter Gent as a high school athlete
- Born: George Davis Peter Gent; August 23, 1942; Bangor, Michigan, U.S.
- Died: September 30, 2011 (aged 69); Bangor, Michigan, U.S.
- Writing career
- Notable work: North Dallas Forty
- Football career

No. 35
- Position: Wide receiver / tight end

Personal information
- Listed height: 6 ft 4 in (1.93 m)
- Listed weight: 205 lb (93 kg)

Career information
- High school: Bangor (MI)
- College: Michigan State
- NFL draft: 1964: undrafted

Career history
- Dallas Cowboys (1964–1968)

Awards and highlights
- Basketball Third-team All-Big Ten (1963); Basketball Second-team All-Big Ten (1964); Big Ten Conference Medal of Honor (1964)
- Stats at Pro Football Reference

George Davis Peter Gent (/dʒɛnt/ JENT; August 23, 1942 – September 30, 2011) was a wide receiver in the National Football League (NFL) for the Dallas Cowboys. He became a novelist after his retirement, authoring the best-seller North Dallas Forty. He played college basketball at Michigan State University.

== Early life ==
Gent attended Bangor High School in Michigan, where he was a standout four-sport athlete (football, basketball, baseball and track). In basketball he led the Bangor Vikings team to the 1960 state Class C Championship, while accumulating a 22.6 scoring average. The team was known as the Cardiac Kids for their late-game wins in District, Regional, Quarter-Final and Semi-Final games. The final game against top-ranked Grand Rapids Lee was no exception: it was tied 41–41 after three quarters and Bangor went on to win 57–45. Gent led the team with 21 points, and was named to the All-Tourney Team which was chosen from schools of all sizes throughout the state.

== College career ==
Gent was a center/forward with the Michigan State basketball team from 1962 to 1964. He became the first Spartan to lead the team in scoring for three consecutive seasons. In his senior year, Gent averaged 21 points per game, and left as MSU's second career scorer, with a total of 1,146 points, averaging 17.4 points per game. He was third team All-Big Ten in 1963 and second team in 1964.

In 1964, Gent was awarded the Big Ten Conference Medal of Honor, which is given annually to a male and female athlete at each of the Big Ten institutions, who demonstrates the greatest proficiency in scholarship and athletics. He graduated from MSU with a BA in advertising.

Gent was the recipient of the 2005 Distinguished Alumnus Award.

== Professional football career ==
=== Dallas Cowboys ===
Although Gent never played a down of college football, the Dallas Cowboys were impressed by his athleticism and offered him a tryout. He went to training camp in the summer of 1964 to receive the $500 ($5,200 in 2025) they were paying to players who attended.

As with Cornell Green whom the team had converted two years earlier, he was first tried at defensive back, but at 6 ft 4 in (193 cm) and 210 pounds (95 kg), he was not agile enough to play in the secondary. The coaches decided that Gent's best chance was at wide receiver, where he wound up making the team and turning down a contract offer from the NBA's Baltimore Bullets, who had selected him in the fourteenth round of the 1964 NBA draft.

Gent became a valuable wide receiver by his second year in 1965, splitting time with Buddy Dial and playing opposite Bob Hayes. He caught sixteen passes for 233 yards and two touchdowns. In 1966, he had ten starts over Dial, registering 27 receptions (third on the team) for 474 yards (averaging 17.6 yard per catch) and one touchdown as the Cowboys won their first division title (Eastern Conference) to qualify for the NFL championship game, but lost to the Green Bay Packers at the Cotton Bowl.

In 1967, with the arrival of Lance Rentzel and health problems, Gent was moved to tight end and played in only seven games (one start). In 1968, he played in ten games (one start), posting sixteen receptions for 194 yards.

Gent's five-season NFL career was marred by injury, as he underwent knee operations and endured constant back problems. He was known for his intelligence, soft hands, and height. He caught passes mostly from quarterback Don Meredith, with whom he enjoyed a close friendship off the field.

=== New York Giants ===
On June 13, 1969, Gent was traded to the New York Giants in exchange for a draft choice (not exercised), and waived on September 8.

== Writing career ==
After leaving professional football, Gent wrote several novels dealing with the sport. His first and most famous book, a semi-autobiographical novel entitled North Dallas Forty, was published in 1973. Its main characters, a quarterback and a wide receiver, are widely considered to be based on Don Meredith and Gent, respectively. The novel was one of the first to examine the NFL's hypocrisy regarding drug use.

North Dallas Forty was made into a movie in 1979, starring Nick Nolte, Mac Davis, G. D. Spradlin, and Dayle Haddon. Gent wrote the screenplay. During the making of the film, he experienced creative difficulties with producer Frank Yablans. After seeing the movie, his old friend and teammate Meredith commented, "If I'd known Gent was as good as he says he was, I would have thrown to him more."

Gent made his home in Texas for many years, where he befriended many of that state's significant creative minds of the day, including Larry L. King, Billy Lee Brammer, Gary Cartwright, Bud Shrake, Jerry Jeff Walker, and Dan Jenkins. They called themselves the Mad Dogs.

Gent also explored the corruption in modern professional sports in a sequel volume entitled North Dallas After 40, published in 1989, and in two unrelated football novels — Texas Celebrity Turkey Trot (1979) and The Franchise (1983).

Gent also wrote a novel about college basketball entitled The Conquering Heroes (1994). Bill Walton's cover blurb states that the book is the "North Dallas Forty of college basketball. But it’s much more, it’s about a whole generation of kids who came of age in an America that I grew up in."

== Personal life ==
Gent had two children, Holly Gent and Carter Davis Gent. He resided in Bangor, Michigan at the time of his death from a pulmonary disease on September 30, 2011, and was working on another novel.
