= Jay Milner =

American journalist

Jay Milner (October 30, 1926 – 2011) was an American journalist, professor and author who worked both for mainstream and alternative publications, and was associated with a group of Texas writers who called themselves the Maddogs and gained fame in the 1950s and 1960s for their literary skills as well as their hard partying.

== Early life ==
The son of John and Nina Milner, Jay Dunston Milner was born on October 30, 1926, near Muleshoe, Texas. He moved with his family among small towns near cotton farms in West Texas. They moved to Lubbock, Texas when Jay was in the second grade. Milner played football for his local high school team, and was part of a state champion football team at Lubbock High.

== Education ==
Milner attended Texas Technological College (now Texas Tech University) in Lubbock. Following service in the U.S. Navy during World War II, he earned bachelor's and master's degrees from the University of Southern Mississippi.

== Career ==
Milner coached high school football for three years, then worked as a reporter for the Associated Press and the Hattiesburg, Mississippi American. He was also the managing editor of the Delta Democrat-Times in Greenville, Miss. In 1959, Milner moved to New York City and joined the New York Herald Tribune as the assistant to the editorial page editor. In 1961 Milner published his first novel, Incident at Ashton, about civil rights unrest in the United States during the 1950s. He left the Herald Tribune to move back to Texas and focus on his writing. From 1965 until the early 1970s, Milner taught journalism at Texas Christian University in Fort Worth, Texas, and Southern Methodist University in Dallas. He joined the Dallas-area Public Broadcasting System affiliate as a reporter and anchor. Milner then assumed editorial duties at Iconoclast, a weekly Dallas alternative newspaper, and was a founding editor of Texas Music magazine, which folded amid financial difficulties. In his later life Milner wrote book reviews for the Lufkin Daily News in Southeast Texas.

=== Maddogs ===
The Maddogs, a group of Texas writers, included among its membership Bud Shrake, Gary Cartwright, Larry L. King, Dan Jenkins, and Billie Lee Brammer. Milner wrote about the group in his 1998 memoir, Confessions of a Maddog: A Romp Through the High-Flying Texas Music and Literary Era of the Fifties to the Seventies.

== Personal life ==
Milner married Gail Brown in 1983, and the couple lived in Fort Worth from 1995 until Milner's death in 2011. Three children and three stepchildren survive him.
