= The Franchise (novel) =

1983 novel by Peter Gent

- Author: Peter Gent
- Publisher: Villard
- Publication date: November 1, 1983

The Franchise is a 1983 novel written by former Dallas Cowboys wide receiver/tight end Peter Gent.

The novel follows a college football quarterback who becomes a star professional player for a corrupt expansion team, which he leads to a championship. While it shares some thematic similarities with Gent's 1973 novel North Dallas Forty, the franchise also incorporates political corruption and murder

== Plot summary ==
Taylor Rusk is a star college quarterback.

Along the way, Rusk is betrayed. One teammate, a chronic con man, becomes the Pistols' general manager and ultimately betrays him. Another teammate suffers a devastating knee injury and the subsequent surgery is botched. Rusk sees him get tossed aside and, due largely to steroid abuse, he murders his family and then takes his own life.

Five years later, the Texas Pistols are world champions, but Taylor Rusk has little time to celebrate. He must save the life of another victim: the woman he has fallen in love with — who is also the mother of his son. They ultimately take control of the Texas Pistols for him.

== Critical reception ==
Kirkus Reviews called the "overlong" novel "a noisy, messy, unconvincing mixture of black comedy, shrill soap opera, and violent, bloody mystery-melodrama." The Washington Post wrote that "underlying the good-ol'-boy humor and Ludlum-like violence, there is a seriousness, a feeling that Gent, as he did in North Dallas Forty, could be revealing something that the National Football League would rather we did not know."
