= The Gay Place =

Novella series by Billy Lee Brammer

- First edition
- Author: Billy Lee Brammer
- Language: English
- Genre: Political fiction
- Publisher: Houghton Mifflin
- Publication date: 1962
- Publication place: United States
- Media type: Print (hardback & paperback)

The Gay Place (1961) is a series of three novellas, with interlocking plots and characters, by American author Billy Lee Brammer. The novellas, published in a single book, include The Flea Circus, Room Enough to Caper and Country Pleasures. Set in an unnamed state identical to Texas, each novella has a different protagonist: Roy Sherwood, a member of the state legislature; Neil Christiansen, the state's junior senator; and Jay McGown, the governor's speechwriter. The governor himself, Arthur Fenstemaker, a master politician (said to have been based on Brammer's mentor Lyndon Johnson) serves as the dominant figure throughout. The book also includes characters based on Brammer, his wife Nadine, Johnson's wife Ladybird, and his brother Sam Houston Johnson.

The book has been widely acclaimed one of the best American political novels ever written.

== Plot ==
In The Flea Circus, Governor Fenstemaker maneuvers conservative state representative Roy Sherwood into helping him get a liberal appropriations bill passed. Roy is having an affair with Ouida Fielding, the estranged wife of another state representative, Earle Fielding. Roy also has to deal with the fact that one of his political colleagues (a rival for Ouida's affection) has probably taken a bribe. These things take place against a background of constant drinking and partying by Roy, his colleagues and their associates and hangers-on. Much of this occurs at the Dearly Beloved Beer and Garden Party (based on Austin’s Scholz Garten), where young politicians drink, philosophize, and gossip.

In Room Enough to Caper, junior U.S. senator Neil Christiansen, who was appointed to the seat by Fenstemaker after another senator's death, returns home to consider running for re-election. Fenstemaker's machinations propel Neil into announcing his candidacy. Meanwhile, Neil tries halfheartedly to rediscover his marriage and his family, yet continues to sleep with a woman who works for him. The novella concerns itself with Christiansen's rising political prospects as his home life deteriorates.

In Country Pleasures, the governor's party drives out to the set of a film starring Vicki McGown, the ex-wife of Fenstemaker's speechwriter Jay McGown. Vicki attempts to win Jay back, which causes tensions between Jay and his girlfriend Sarah (also the governor's secretary). Vicki takes the governor and Jay on a joyride to an old Mexican village, where the governor drunkenly signs Texas back to the Mexicans. The latter part of the story deals with an attempt to cover up a scandal which breaks open in the governor's absence.

== Main characters ==
Neal Christiansen
Junior U.S. senator, the protagonist of Room Enough to Caper.
Willie England
Close friend of Roy Sherwood, and editor of a small liberal weekly political journal, based on Willie Morris, who at the time of the book's writing had just taken over the Texas Observer.
Arthur Fenstemaker
The governor of the state, politically astute and a master manipulator, generally thought to have been based on Lyndon Johnson.
Hoot Gibson Fenstemaker
The governor's brother, based on Lyndon Johnson's brother, Sam Houston Johnson.
Sweet Mama Fenstemaker
The governor's wife, based on Lyndon Johnson's wife, Lady Bird Johnson.
Earle Fielding
Member of the state house of representatives.
Ouida Fielding
Earl Fielding's unfaithful wife, based on Brammer's wife Nadine.
Sarah Lehman
The governor's secretary, and Jay McGown's girlfriend.
Jay McGown
The governor's speechwriter, based on Brammer himself. He is the protagonist of Country Pleasures.
Vicki McGown
Jay McGown's ex-wife, a blonde bombshell movie star.
Roy Sherwood
Member of the state house of representatives, unmotivated scion of a wealthy family, having an affair with Ouida Fielding. Brammer may have based Roy on Texas politicians Bob Hughes, Malcolm McGregor, and perhaps Robert C. Eckhardt (though Eckhardt himself disavowed the connection), who later became Nadine Brammer's second husband. He is the protagonist of The Flea Circus.

== Models for Arthur Fenstemaker ==
Although many believe that the character of Governor Fenstemaker is based on Lyndon Johnson) there are many dissimilarities. Johnson was never the governor of Texas, and at the time of the book's writing had served as a U.S. congressman and U.S. senator, as well as the U.S. Senate Majority Leader. Several people, including Brammer's wife at the time, claim that Governor Earl Long of Louisiana was a major influence. Others say that Brammer repeatedly said that Fenstemaker was based on former Texas Governor Beauford H. Jester, and pointed to important events in the book which mirrored events in Jester's life.

== Title reference ==
The title comes from a line in an F. Scott Fitzgerald poem, "Thousand-and-first Ship," which begins:

In the fall of sixteen
In the cool of the afternoon
I saw Helena
Under a white moon—
I heard Helena
In a haunted doze
Say: “I know a gay place
Nobody knows.”

== Reception ==
The book was not a commercial success, but was widely praised by critics. Willie Morris called the novel "The best novel about American politics in our time." David Halberstam called it one of two classic American political novels (the other one being All the King's Men). Gore Vidal also called it an American classic. In 2005, Christopher Lehmann called the book "the one truly great modern American political novel."

Brammer won the Houghton Mifflin Literary Fellowship Award for the book in 1960.

Lyndon Johnson claimed not to have read past the first 10 pages of the book, but responded by denying Brammer White House press credentials. It is generally believed that he did this at the behest of his wife Ladybird, whose portrait as Sweet Mama Fenstemaker in the book is a caricature.

== Unfinished film adaptation ==
In 1963, the film rights to The Gay Place were sold to Paul Newman, who intended to play Roy Sherwood. Columbia Pictures agreed to finance it, and Jackie Gleason, who had just played opposite Newman in The Hustler, was cast as Arthur Fenstemaker. Work started on a script, and location scouting. However, the assassination of President Kennedy later that year caused these plans to be dropped.
