= My Heart Hemmed In =

2007 novel by Marie NDiaye

- Author: Marie NDiaye
- Original title: Mon coeur à l'étroit
- Translator: Jordan Stump
- Language: French
- Published: French: 2007 (Èditions Gallimard) English: 2017 (Two Lines Press)
- Publication place: France
- ISBN: 978-1-931883-62-7

My Heart Hemmed In (French: Mon Cœur à l’étroit) (2007) is a novel written by Marie NDiaye and translated into English by Jordan Stump in 2017. The publisher of the French novel was Éditions Gallimard. Two Lines Press published Stump’s translation.

The novel follows Nadia, a middle aged teacher, as she tries to understand her changing circumstances and the reasons they are changing. She struggles to determine why society has begun to exclude her and her husband so completely. Nadia’s narration of the novel provides the reader with a first-hand account of her descent into paranoia. Her fear is heightened by the physical danger in which the hatred has placed her husband, by her mutating environment, and by the people whose roles in her life have shifted in unexpected and disturbing ways.

My Heart Hemmed In, along with other pieces by NDiaye, has received attention in multiple scholarly articles/books and global conventions.

== Plot ==
Nadia and Ange Lacordeyre are married and happily teaching in Bordeaux, France when they are suddenly ostracized from their school and local communities. Nadia worked hard to be accepted into her affluent community; thus, she is confused as to why her acceptance switched to exclusion. Her inner turmoil is further compounded by how the city she loves seems to shift and become unrecognizable when she walks in it alone.

Early in the story, Nadia's second husband, Ange, receives a mysterious injury on his torso after which their hated neighbor, Noget, appears in their home and insists on helping them. Noget cooks for them and cares for Ange, who does not recover until Nadia leaves their apartment to escape the community's hatred. Nadia blames her increasing weight on the decadent food Noget makes, and she claims to be enduring menopause; other characters know she is too young for menopause and believe she is pregnant. The "thing" developing inside Nadia grows as she confronts aspects of herself, aspects being called to her attention through the exclusion by her peers and by the derision of Noget.

While coming to terms with the new repugnance she inspires in people, Nadia has interactions with her unnamed ex-husband who she left because he was a remnant of her more impoverished life in the Les Aubiers projects, a life about which she wanted to forget. Nadia's divorce settlement benefited her but destroyed her ex-husband. The emotional and financial turmoil from the divorce caused him to spiral into a depression. At the end of the story, Nadia hears that her ex-husband has been killed by Lanton. Lanton is her son's ex-lover, and he helps Nadia update her ID so that she can travel to San Augusto. Lanton insists she deliver a letter to her son, and he claims if she does not deliver the letter, he will know and will kill her second husband, Ange. Nadia delivers the letter, but her son does not follow the instructions written within it; instead of Lanton killing Ange, Nadia's ex-husband dies.

Nadia's encounters with her son, Ralph, call to Nadia's mind her simultaneously loving and abusive relationship with him when he was younger. She eventually escapes Bordeaux to live with him in San Augusto. On her commute, she encounters a woman named Nathalie; Nadia’s discomfited brain causes her to question whether the woman is a ghost or not. The train the two of them are taking out of the city stops without warning or reason, so they decide to rent a car to avoid missing their ferry. Nathalie tells Nadia her story, but Nadia zones out and does not pay attention to any of it. Nadia's guilt over ignoring Nathalie's plight returns to haunt her later in the story. It causes her to search for Nathalie and eventually fall on Nathalie's knees, suppliantly asking for forgiveness.

The scene in Ralph's town is complicated by a possibly cannibalistic wife (who may have eaten his first wife) and by the discovery that Nadia’s parents now live near the home of her son. It is after making peace with the parents she abandoned, the son she scorned, and the granddaughter whose name had always inspired disgust in her that she gives birth to the "thing" causing her to gain weight. The being inside her was not a baby but rather a demonic black slithering “thing.” The story closes with the discovery of a healthy Ange bounding on the beach with Nadia's ex-husband's lover.

== Characters ==
- Nadia Lacordeyre: Nadia is the main character of My Heart Hemmed In. The novel is told in first-person from Nadia's perspective which is noticeably unreliable. She is a middle-aged school teacher who asserts teaching is her life’s purpose. Although NDiaye never explicitly writes what Nadia’s ethnicity is, multiple details point to a North African descent. Nadia’s realization that people around her suddenly despise her marks the beginning of her psychological unraveling. She loses her job at the school and cannot comprehend what went wrong. Every person she talks to makes half-finished statements, implying she should know what is occurring; when she asks them directly about why these things are happening to her, they evade answering. Nadia’s incomprehension clouds the entire story. Other characters say that things are hard for people like her, but Nadia does not know what group of people they are referencing who are like her. At certain points in the story, she sees groups of people and briefly identifies with them, but the similarities she notices are never expressly written. Nadia oscillates between the present moment and disjointed thoughts or flashbacks, giving the story more depth and revealing pieces of her personality she does not recognize outright. At the beginning of the novel, she sees herself as innocent, respectable, and high-class and is often disgusted by the people around her - seeing herself as better. The sudden ostracization causes her inner-monologue to rapidly descend into fear and paranoia. Thoughts of self-hatred, suppressed memories, and things buried begin to surface. When Noget begins taking care of Nadia and Ange, Nadia can’t stand his presence, yet she feels powerless to stop him. Every time she speaks to Ange, she is repelled by his gruff responses and feels she does not know who he is anymore. Nadia notices her body seems to be growing and distorting. These scenes involving disgust reinforce the alienation Nadia experiences from all sides and connect to her self-imposed alienation from her parents and past.
- Ange Lacordeyre: Ange is Nadia’s second husband, and, like Nadia, is a school teacher.
- Richard Victor Noget: Noget is Nadia and Ange’s neighbor. Noget is a famous author who is known to all except Nadia, who has always hated him.
- Nadia’s ex-husband: Nadia’s first husband is described as a simple-minded man who lacks taste.
- Ralph: Ralph is Nadia’s son by her ex-husband. Ralph and Nadia’s relationship is extremely tense for the entirety of the novel.
- Wilma: Wilma is Ralph’s current lover, with whom he lives.
- Lanton: Lanton is Ralph’s former lover.
- Souhar: Souhar is Ralph’s daughter and Nadia’s granddaughter. Souhar is not seen by Nadia until the very end of the story, but her name is brought up numerous times throughout. Her name is a sticking point for Nadia, as it is representative of the heritage and ethnicity Nadia is trying her best to erase from her life and memory.
- Nathalie: Nathalie is a woman Nadia meets on her way to see her son. Nathalie is described as a thin blonde woman whose expression is filled with grief, and she is the only person who is kind to Nadia.

== Genre ==
My Heart Hemmed In has received classifications as different genres. Some label it as a “contemporary nightmare” with elements of both the surreal and reality that contribute to an unnerving sense. Other authors call NDiaye’s book a “light fantastic.” This term results from a quote by NDiaye herself which discusses how her mix of reality and the fantastic allows her to “lighten up the heaviness of the world.” The 'light fantastic" label includes a discussion of how NDiaye uses modernity, well-known cities, and common technological appliances to create a space the reader recognizes as their own. Bringing elements of fiction and psychological confusion into her setting allows NDiaye to create senses of both reality and paranoia within her protagonist and her readers. Some critics do not label My Heart Hemmed In with a genre at all but instead give a range within which they believe it falls. Between “magical realism and narrative paranoia” is a possible spectrum for the novel.

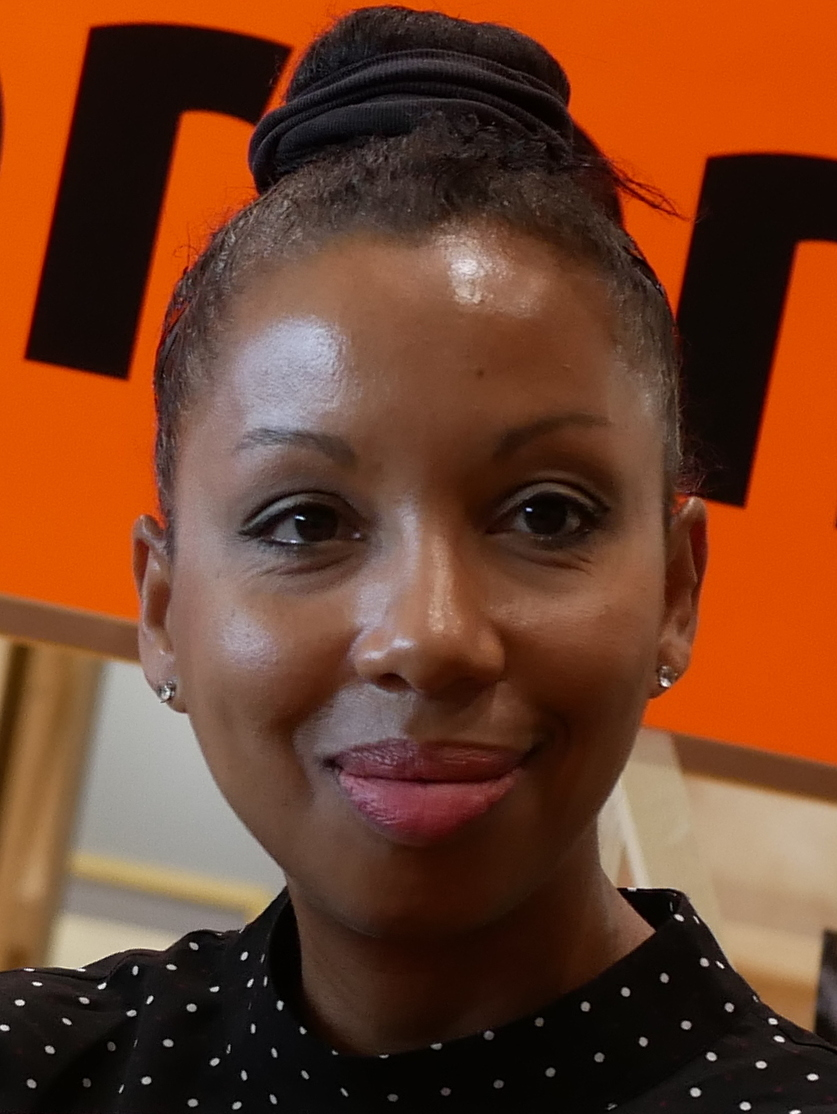
Marie NDiaye, the author of My Heart Hemmed In.

== Connections between NDiaye and Nadia ==
Many of the elements from which Nadia attempts to escape in her life in Bordeaux seem to mimic elements of the author's life. NDiaye was born in France to a French woman and a Senegalese man. Nadia was born in Les Aubiers, France but has Maghrebi origins. In early interviews, NDiaye appeared to try to distance herself from the pain racialization could cause her. Most of the actions Nadia performs demonstrate her wanting to forget her past and deny how her skin color might affect how people treat her. Tied to her skin color is her surname. NDiaye is not a French name. This is reflected in Nadia's granddaughter's name, Souhar, which Nadia finds repulsive likely because it is not French. NDiaye's parents separated; Nadia is divorced from her first husband. NDiaye's mother was a schoolteacher, and Nadia herself is a schoolteacher. Both author and protagonist also experienced an invasion of their home: Nadia’s neighbor, Noget, forced his way into her apartment, and a political party purporting extremist and racist views took power in France where NDiaye lived.
