= The Witch (novel) =

1996 novel by Marie NDiaye

- Author: Marie NDiaye
- Original title: La sorcière
- Translator: Jordan Stump
- Language: French
- Publisher: Les Éditions de Minuit (1996, original), MacLehose Press (2026, English translation)
- Publication date: 1996
- English publication date: 2026

The Witch (French: La sorcière) is a 1996 novel written by French author Marie NDiaye. The novel follows the life of Lucie, a witch of mediocre skill. The English translation by Jordan Stump was shortlisted for the 2026 International Booker Prize.

== Premise ==
Lucie is a witch who lives in a provincial French town. Her magic abilities are mediocre compared to her mother's abilities - she is only able to foresee certain types of trivia. Her husband has forbidden her to perform magic, but against his wishes, Lucie teaches her 12-year-old twin daughters to perform magic; they turn out to be more powerful than Lucie imagined.

== Reception ==
Contemporary reception was mixed. Lucie L. Dehon of The French Review in a mixed review called the novel "pleasant", but commented that NDiaye, in her previous novels, created female protagonists "without psychological depth, who move from one situation to another without a motive to their actions", and stated that The Witch followed the same trend. Charlotte H. Bruner in a review for World Literature Today wrote that NDiaye's novel was "heavy-handed" and that her characters failed to "engage the reader", and criticized the lack of resolution for certain plotlines. Pierre Lepape, writing for Le Monde, commented that NDiaye "stands out first and foremost for her originality" and praised the prose; he concluded that The Witch was "above all a delightful book written with pleasure, for the pleasure of itself and for that of its readers."

The 2026 English translation received warmer reviews. The New York Times in its review called it "taut, spellbinding and strange" and praised Stump's translation as "artful"; Kirkus Reviews called the novel "unsettling and evocative" and praised Stump's translation. Kristen Roupenian in a positive review for The New Yorker, praised the novel's humour. The novel was shortlisted for the 2026 International Booker Prize.
