= Rosie Carpe =

2001 novel

First edition

Rosie Carpe is a 2001 novel by the French writer Marie NDiaye. It received the 2001 Prix Femina. It was originally published in France by Les Éditions de Minuit. The English translation by Tamsin Black was published in 2004 by the University of Nebraska Press.

== Summary ==
The novel follows the titular character, Rosie Carpe, as she attempts to reconnect with her estranged brother in Guadeloupe.
