= Three Strong Women =

2009 novel by Marie NDiaye

- First edition
- Author: Marie NDiaye
- Original title: Trois Femmes puissantes
- Language: French
- Publisher: Éditions Gallimard
- Publication date: 20 August 2009
- Publication place: France
- English publication date: 26 April 2012
- ISBN: 978-0857050564

Three Strong Women (French: Trois Femmes puissantes) is a 2009 novel by French writer Marie NDiaye. It won the 2009 Prix Goncourt, France's most prestigious literary award. The English translation by John Fletcher was published in April, 2012, in the UK by MacLehose Press, and in August 2012, by Knopf in the USA. An extract was included in the 2019 anthology New Daughters of Africa, edited by Margaret Busby.

According to the description by Maya Jaggi in The Guardian: "Moving mainly between France and Senegal, this novel explores survival, inheritance and the feared repetition of history – within families, as between peoples. Its three heroines have an unassailable sense of their self-worth, while their psychological battles have an almost mythic resonance."

== Summary ==
The novel is composed of three accounts and is a history of three women, Norah, Fanta and Khady, who reject humiliation and embrace life. The unifying theme is that they are threatened or abandoned by men.

The first story is inspired in part by Ndiaye's own life, and is built around the departure of a Senegalese father from France, taking with him his only son Sony, and abandoning his wife and daughters (Ndiaye's Senegalese father left when she was a year old, in a similar way). One daughter, Norah, now married and with children of her own, is working as a lawyer in Paris. She is summoned to Dakar by her absent father, supposedly a successful businessman. On arrival, she discovers her brother Sony is in prison for the alleged murder of his stepmother, and the father — whom she still fears and dislikes — wants her to defend him in court. He is now broke. Sony then alleges from prison that his father was actually the murderer, leaving Norah to challenge her father...but the account ends there.

The second story takes place in the Gironde in France (where Marie Ndiaye actually owns a house), where Fanta, a teacher, and her academic husband Rudy have a serious argument, and he shouts "go back where you came from". This racist remark has repercussions for their relationship. An earlier racist incident in their lives, which led to them fleeing Senegal where he had been teaching in the International School, is revealed. The theme is of patriarchal control, and a life unravelling — as in the first story, control over children is an issue.

The third part returns to a maid, Khady Demba, whom the reader encountered in Norah's father's house in Dakar. Despite getting "a minuscule helping of the good things in life" she is nourished by determination, and memories of a caring grandmother. Khady is later widowed and abandoned and sets out on a journey to Europe. When she abandons a first attempt to leave by boat and is badly injured, she encounters a young man becomes her lover and persuades her to join him on the journey through the desert. Robbed by border police, she is forced into prostitution when they run out of all their money. He eventually robs and abandons her. Finally we see her trying and failing to climb the border fence at one of the Spanish enclaves in Morocco.

== Awards and honours ==
- 2009: Prix Goncourt, winner.
- 2014: International Dublin Literary Award, one of eight finalists, for the English translation.

== See also ==
- 2009 in literature
- Contemporary French literature
