= Marie NDiaye =

French novelist and playwright (born 1967)

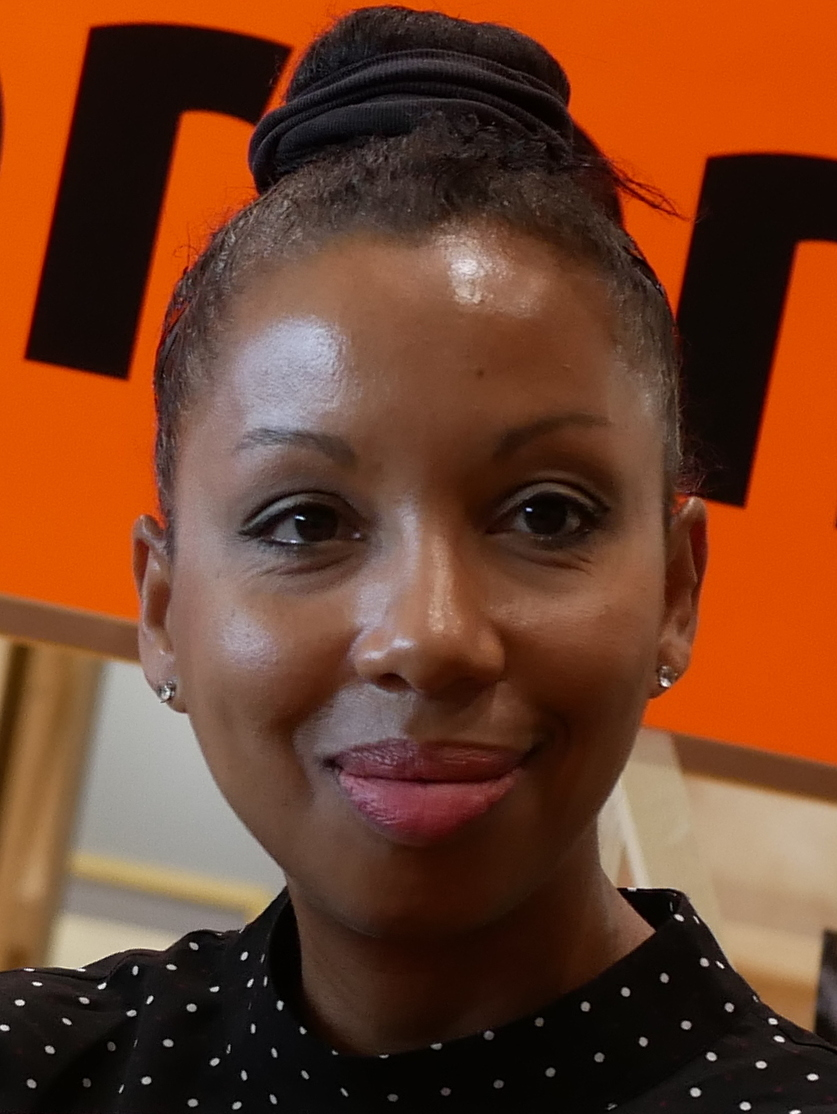
- NDiaye in 2017
- Born: 4 June 1967 (age 59); Pithiviers, Loiret, France
- Occupations: Novelist, essayist, playwright
- Spouse: Jean-Yves Cendrey
- Relatives: Pap Ndiaye (brother)
- Writing career
- Period: 1984–present
- Notable awards: Prix Goncourt (2009); Nelly Sachs Prize (2015)

Marie NDiaye (born 4 June 1967) is a French novelist, playwright and screenwriter. She published her first novel, Quant au riche avenir, when she was 17. She won the Prix Goncourt in 2009 for her novel Trois femmes puissantes (Three Strong Women). Her play Papa doit manger is the sole play by a living female writer to be part of the repertoire of the Comédie française. She co-wrote the screenplay for the 2022 legal drama Saint Omer alongside its director Alice Diop, and Amrita David. In September 2022, the film was selected as France's official selection for Best International Film at the 95th Academy Awards. The English translation of her novel The Witch, by Jordan Stump, was published in 2026 and was shortlisted for the International Booker Prize.

== Biography ==
NDiaye was born in 1967 in Pithiviers, France, to a French mother and a Senegalese father. She grew up with her mother and her brother Pap Ndiaye in the suburbs of Paris. Her parents met as students in the mid-1960s, but her father returned to Senegal when she was one year old.

She began writing at the age of 12. As a senior in high school, she was discovered by Jerome Lindon, founder of Éditions de Minuit, who published her first novel, Quant au riche avenir, in 1985.

She subsequently wrote six more novels, all published by Minuit, and a collection of short stories. She also wrote her Comédie classique, a 200-page novel made up of a single sentence, which was published by Éditions P.O.L in 1988, when she was 21 years old. In addition, NDiaye has written several plays. She co-wrote the screenplay for White Material with director Claire Denis. NDiaye's 2003 drama Papa doit manger is distinguished as the second play by a female writer to be taken into the repertoire of the Comédie française.

In 1998, NDiaye wrote a letter to the press in which she argued that her novel La Sorcière, published two years earlier, had strongly informed the content of Naissance des fantômes, the second novel of successful author Marie Darrieussecq.

NDiaye's novel Trois femmes puissantes won the 2009 Prix Goncourt. In his 2013 critical study of the author, Marie NDiaye: Blankness and Recognition, British academic Andrew Asibong describes her as "the epitome of a certain kind of cultural brilliance". In his psychoanalytic exploration of the writer's evocation of trauma and disavowal, he says that "NDiaye's work explores the violence done to the subject's capacity for feeling and knowing".

In 2026, her novel The Witch, translated into English by Jordan Stump, was shortlisted for the International Booker Prize. NDiaye was shortlisted for the prize in 2013 for her entire body of work.

== Exile in Berlin ==
In an interview published by Les Inrockuptibles on 30 August 2009, NDiaye declared about Sarkozy's France:

"I find that France monstrous. The fact that we [with her companion, writer Jean-Yves Cendrey and their three children-- editor's note] have chosen to live in Berlin for two years is far from being unrelated to that. We left just after the elections, in a large part because of Sarkozy, even if I am very aware that saying that can seem snobbish. I find that atmosphere of vulgarity and heavy policing detestable ... Besson, Hortefeux, all of those people, I find them monstrous".

== Awards and honours ==
- 2001: Prix Femina for Rosie Carpe
- 2009: Prix Goncourt for Trois femmes puissantes (Three Strong Women)
- 2012: Grand prix du théâtre de l'Académie française
- 2015: Nelly Sachs Prize
- 2016: Ladivine longlisted for Man Booker International Prize
- 2017: Ladivine shortlisted for Best Translated Book Award
- 2018: Ladivine shortlisted for the International Dublin Literary Award
- 2023: Austrian State Prize for European Literature
- 2026: The Witch shortlisted for the International Booker Prize

== Works ==
=== Novels and short stories ===
- Quant au riche avenir – Les Editions de Minuit, 1985 (ISBN 2-7073-1018-2)
- Comédie classique – Éditions P.O.L, 1988 (ISBN 2-86744-082-3)
- La femme changée en bûche – Minuit, 1989 (ISBN 2-7073-1285-1)
- En famille – Minuit, 1991 (ISBN 2-7073-1367-X)
  - Translated into English as Among Family by Heather Doyal – Angela Royal Publishing, 1997 (ISBN 978-1899860401)
- Un temps de saison – Minuit, 1994 (ISBN 2-7073-1474-9)
  - Translated into English as That Time of Year by Jordan Stump – Two Lines Press, 2020 (ISBN 978-1931883917)
- La Sorcière – Minuit, 1996 (ISBN 2-7073-1569-9)
  - Translated into English as The Witch by Jordan Stump – Vintage, 2026
- Rosie Carpe – Minuit, Prix Femina 2001 (ISBN 2-7073-1740-3)
  - Translated into English as Rosie Carpe by Tamsin Black – Bison Books, 2004 (ISBN 978-0803283831)
- Tous mes amis, nouvelles – Minuit, 2004 (ISBN 2-7073-1859-0)
  - Translated into English as All My Friends by Jordan Stump – Two Lines Press, 2013 (ISBN 978-1931883238)
- Autoportrait en vert – Mercure de France, 2005 (ISBN 2-7152-2481-8)
  - Translated into English as Self-Portrait in Green by Jordan Stump – Two Lines Press, 2014 (ISBN 978-1931883399)
- Mon cœur a l'etroit – Éditions Gallimard, 2007 (ISBN 978-2-07-077457-9)
  - Translated into English as My Heart Hemmed In by Jordan Stump – Two Lines Press, 2017 (ISBN 978-1931883627)
- Trois femmes puissantes – Gallimard, Prix Goncourt, 2009 (ISBN 978-2070786541).
  - Translated into English as Three Strong Women by John Fletcher – MacLehose Press & Alfred A. Knopf, 2013 (ISBN 978-0857051073); extracted in New Daughters of Africa, edited by Margaret Busby (2019).
- Ladivine – Gallimard, 2013 (ISBN 978-2-07-012669-9)
  - Translated into English as Ladivine by Jordan Stump – Alfred A. Knopf, 2016 (ISBN 978-0385351881) & MacLehose Press, 2016 (ISBN 978-0857053350)
- La Cheffe, roman d'une cuisinière – Gallimard, 2016 (ISBN 978-2070116232)
  - Translated into English as The Cheffe by Jordan Stump – Alfred A. Knopf, 2019 (ISBN 978-0525520474) & MacLehose Press, 2019 (ISBN 978-0857058904)
- La vengeance m’appartient – Gallimard, 2022 (ISBN 9782072977220)
  - Translated into English as Vengeance is Mine by Jordan Stump – Alfred A. Knopf, 2023 (ISBN 9780593534243)
- Le bon Denis – Mercure de France, 2025

=== Plays ===
- Hilda – Minuit, 1999 (ISBN 2-7073-1661-X)
- Papa doit manger – Minuit, 2003 (ISBN 2-7073-1798-5)
- Rien d'humain – Les Solitaires Intempestifs, 2004 (ISBN 2-84681-095-8)
- Les serpents – Minuit, 2004 (ISBN 2-7073-1856-6)

=== Children's novels ===
- La diablesse et son enfant, illustration Nadja – École des Loisirs, 2000 (ISBN 2211056601)
- Les paradis de Prunelle, illustration Pierre Mornet – Albin Michel Jeunesse, 2003 (ISBN 2226140689)
- Le souhait, illustration Alice Charbin – École des Loisirs, 2005 (ISBN 2211079628)

=== Essays ===
- La naufragée – Flohic, 1999 (ISBN 2842340620)

=== Screenplay ===
- White Material (2009), co-written with director Claire Denis
- Saint Omer (2022), co-written with Amrita David and director Alice Diop
