= Sam Houston Johnson =

American politician (1914–1978)

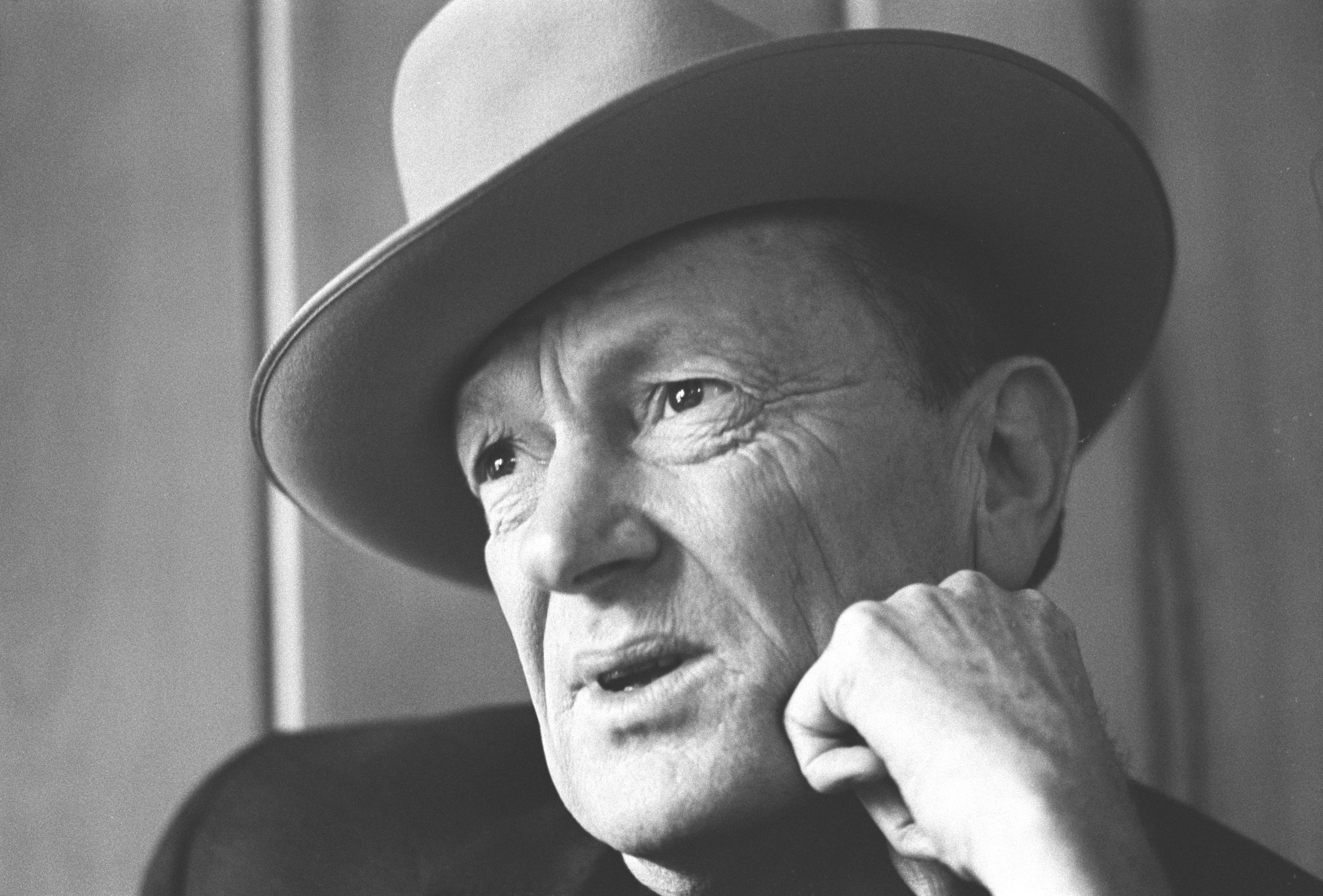
- Johnson in 1968
- Born: Sam Houston Johnson; January 31, 1914; Johnson City, Texas, U.S.
- Died: December 11, 1978 (aged 64); Austin, Texas, U.S.
- Education: Texas State University; Cumberland School of Law (LL.B.)
- Spouses: Albertine Summers (m. 1940; div. 1944) Mary Jane Michelson Fish (m. 1955, divorced)
- Children: 2
- Parent(s): Samuel Ealy Johnson Jr. Rebekah Baines

Sam Houston Johnson (January 31, 1914 – December 11, 1978) was an American businessman. He was the younger brother of President Lyndon B. Johnson.

== Early life ==
Sam Houston Johnson was born in Johnson City, Texas on January 31, 1914, to Samuel Ealy Johnson Jr. and Rebekah Baines. He attended Southwest Texas State Teachers College, as had his brother Lyndon, and the University of Texas at Austin. He received a law degree from Cumberland School of Law in 1934.

== Early career ==
For most of his life, Johnson was an aide and adviser to his older brother Lyndon B. Johnson; he was part of a network of supporters his brother used to maintain awareness of and control over political activities in Texas. When Lyndon Johnson was appointed Director of the National Youth Administration in Texas in the 1930s, Sam Houston Johnson replaced him as chief aide to Congressman Richard M. Kleberg.

Johnson later worked for the National Youth Administration in Texas. He also worked as an appraiser for the Federal Land Bank in Houston, and reported to his brother on its activities.

During World War II, Johnson worked on the staff of the War Production Board. In addition, he was employed as a member of his brother's Senate staff and worked on Lyndon Johnson's campaigns.

Besides working for and with his brother, Johnson also worked as an insurance executive and as the Mexico representative of a Texas international trucking company.

== Later career ==
Johnson was an alcoholic. In his later years, his drinking, coupled with physical disability caused by a broken hip, limited his effectiveness as a member of his brother's organization.

In 1970 Johnson wrote a memoir, My Brother Lyndon, which praised his brother in most respects, but was critical in others. At the time, Johnson indicated that he was estranged from his brother, but said his book was not the cause. The two reconciled before Lyndon Johnson's death.

According to published accounts, Johnson stopped drinking in 1972 and underwent a religious conversion, becoming a regular attendee at services of Austin's non-denominational Community Church.

Historian Robert Caro interviewed Johnson as one of his numerous sources while conducting research for The Years of Lyndon Johnson. According to Caro, he at first considered Johnson to be unreliable, largely as a result of his drinking. Caro said that he considered Johnson more credible in their subsequent encounters, largely because of his sobriety and religious conversion.

== Death and burial ==
In 1976 Johnson was diagnosed with cancer and had a malignant tumor removed from his lung. His lung cancer returned, and Johnson died at Holy Cross Hospital in Austin, Texas on December 11, 1978. He is buried in the Johnson Family Cemetery in Stonewall, Texas.

== Marriage and family ==
In 1940, Johnson married Albertine Summers. They divorced in 1944. Their children included a daughter, Josefa Roxane (or Roxanne) (b. 1941), and a son, Samuel Summers (b. 1942).

In 1955, Johnson married again to Mary Jane Michelson Fish. They later divorced.
