= North Dallas Forty =

1979 film by Ted Kotcheff

- Theatrical release poster by Morgan Kane
- Directed by: Ted Kotcheff
- Screenplay by: Peter Gent; Ted Kotcheff; Frank Yablans
- Based on: North Dallas Forty by Peter Gent
- Produced by: Frank Yablans
- Starring: Nick Nolte; Mac Davis; Charles Durning; Dayle Haddon; Bo Svenson; John Matuszak; Steve Forrest; G.D. Spradlin; Dabney Coleman; Savannah Smith Boucher
- Cinematography: Paul Lohmann
- Edited by: Jay Kamen
- Music by: John Scott
- Production company: Regina Associates
- Distributed by: Paramount Pictures
- Release dates: August 1, 1979 (New York); August 3, 1979 (United States)
- Running time: 119 minutes
- Country: United States
- Language: English
- Box office: $26.1 million

North Dallas Forty is a 1979 American comedy-drama sports film starring Nick Nolte, Mac Davis, and G. D. Spradlin set in the decadent world of American professional football in the late 1970s. It was directed by Ted Kotcheff and based on the best-selling 1973 novel by Peter Gent. The screenplay was by Kotcheff, Gent, Frank Yablans, and Nancy Dowd (uncredited). This was the first film role for Davis, a popular country music recording artist.

== Plot ==
In the late-1970s, Phil Elliott plays wide receiver for the North Dallas Bulls professional football team, based in Dallas, Texas, which closely resembles the Dallas Cowboys. Although considered to possess "the best hands in the game", the aging Elliott has been benched and relies heavily on painkillers. Elliott and popular quarterback Seth Maxwell are outstanding players, but they characterize the drug-, sex-, and alcohol-fueled party atmosphere of that era. Elliott wants only to play the game, retire, and live on a horse farm with his girlfriend Charlotte, an aspiring writer who appears to be financially independent due to a trust fund from her wealthy family and who has no interest whatsoever in football.

The Bulls play for iconic Coach Strother, who turns a blind eye to anything that his players may be doing off the field or anything that his assistant coaches and trainers condone to keep those players in the game. The coach is focused on player "tendencies", a quantitative measurement of their performance, and seems less concerned about the human aspect of the game and the players. One player, Shaddock, finally erupts to assistant Coach Johnson: "Every time I call it a 'game', you call it a 'business'. And every time I call it a 'business', you call it a 'game'." The coaches manipulate Elliott to convince a younger, injured rookie on the team to start using painkillers.

Elliott's nonconformist attitude incurs the coach's wrath more than once, and at one point, the coach informs Elliott that his continuing attitude could affect his future career with the Bulls. In the final game of the season, Elliott catches a touchdown pass with no time left on the clock to get North Dallas to within one point of division rival Chicago, but the Bulls lose the game due to a mishandled snap on the extra point attempt. In a meeting with the team owners and Coach Strother, Elliott learns that a Dallas detective has been hired by the Bulls to follow him. They reveal proof of his marijuana use and a sexual relationship with a woman named Joanne, who intends to marry team executive Emmett Hunter, the brother of owner Conrad Hunter. It is loosely implied that Emmett might be gay, and it is why she went to Elliott for her sexual needs. Although the detective witnessed quarterback Seth Maxwell engaging in similar behavior, he pretends not to have recognized him. They tell Elliott that he is to be suspended without pay pending a league hearing, and Elliott, convinced that the entire investigation is merely a pretext to allow the team to save money on his contract, quits the team, telling the Hunter brothers that he does not need their money that bad.

As he is leaving the team's headquarters in downtown Dallas, Elliott runs into Maxwell, who seems to have been waiting for him. Elliott informs him that he quit, prompting Maxwell to ask if his name came up in the meeting. Elliott deduces that Maxwell knew about the investigation the entire time. As Elliott walks away, Maxwell briefly reminisces about their time together on and off the football field. Maxwell prompts Elliott to turn around and throws a football to him, but Elliott lets it hit him in the chest and fall incomplete as he shrugs and throws his arms out to his sides, signifying that he truly is done with the game.

== Behind the scenes ==
Part drama, comedy and satire, North Dallas Forty is widely considered a classic sports film, providing insights into the lives of professional athletes.

Based on the semiautobiographical novel by Peter Gent, a Cowboys wide receiver in the late 1960s, the film's characters closely resemble his teammates of that era, with Seth Maxwell often compared to quarterback Don Meredith, B.A. Strother to Tom Landry and Elliott to Gent. Of the story, Meredith said, "If I'd known Gent was as good as he says he was, I would have thrown to him more."

== Cast ==
- Nick Nolte as Phil Elliott
- Mac Davis as Seth Maxwell
- G.D. Spradlin as B.A. Strother (head coach)
- Dayle Haddon as Charlotte Caulder
- Bo Svenson as Joe Bob Priddy
- John Matuszak as O.W. Shaddock
- Marshall Colt as Art Hartman
- Steve Forrest as Conrad Hunter (team owner)
- Dabney Coleman as Emmett Hunter
- Charles Durning as Coach Johnson
- Savannah Smith Boucher as Joanne Rodney

== Reception ==
=== Critical reception ===
The film opened to positive reviews, with some critics calling it one of Ted Kotcheff's best films. In her review for The New York Times, Janet Maslin wrote: "The central friendship in the movie, beautifully delineated, is the one between Mr. Nolte and Mac Davis, who expertly plays the team's quarterback, a man whose calculating nature and complacency make him all the more likable, somehow." Time magazine's Richard Schickel wrote: "North Dallas Forty retains enough of the original novel's authenticity to deliver strong, if brutish, entertainment". Newsweek magazine's David Ansen wrote: "The writers – Kotcheff, Gent and producer Frank Yablans – are nonetheless to be congratulated for allowing their story to live through its characters, abjuring Rocky-like fantasy configurations for the harder realities of the game. North Dallas Forty isn't subtle or finely tuned, but like a crunching downfield tackle, it leaves its mark."

However, in his review for The Globe and Mail, Rick Groen wrote: "North Dallas Forty descends into farce and into the lone man versus the corrupt system mentality deprives it of real resonance. It's still not the honest portrait of professional athletics that sport buffs have been waiting for." Sports Illustrated magazine's Frank Deford wrote: "If North Dallas Forty is reasonably accurate, the pro game is a gruesome human abattoir, worse even than previously imagined. Much of the strength of this impression can be attributed to Nick Nolte...Unfortunately, Nolte's character, Phil Elliott, is often fuzzily drawn, which makes the actor's accomplishment all the more impressive." In his review for The Washington Post, Gary Arnold wrote: "Charlotte, who seemed a creature of rhetorical fancy in the novel, still remains a trifle remote and unassimilated. Dayle Haddon may also be a little too prim and standoffish to achieve a satisfying romantic chemistry with Nolte: Somehow, the temperaments don't mesh."

As of September 2025, North Dallas Forty holds a rating of 86% based on 28 reviews on Rotten Tomatoes. The site's critical consensus states: "Muddled overall, but perceptive and brutally realistic, North Dallas Forty also benefits from strong performances by Nick Nolte and Charles Durning. Football fans will likely find it fascinating."

=== Box office ===
The film grossed $2,787,489 in its opening weekend. The following weekend saw the weekend gross increase to $2,906,268. After 32 days from 654 theatres, it had grossed $19,010,710 and went on to gross $26,079,312 in the United States and Canada.

=== NFL reaction ===
The National Football League was suspected of retaliating against those who had participated in the making of North Dallas Forty. Three NFL teams canceled scouting contracts with Hall of Famer Tom Fears, an advisor for the film's football action. The Oakland Raiders severed ties with Fred Biletnikoff, who coached Nick Nolte. Tommy Reamon, who plays Delma, was cut by the 49ers after the film's release, and claimed that he had been "blackballed".

== Differences from the novel ==
The novel contains recurring accounts of television and radio news reporting violent crimes, war and environmental destruction, but these scenes do not appear in the film. The novel contains more sex, violence and substance abuse than the film, without the comedic overtones of the latter. A comedic scene in the film in which an unwilling girl is harassed at a party is instead a brutal near-rape at an orgy in the novel.

The novel, and not the film, ends with a shocking twist in which Phil returns to Charlotte to tell her that he has left football and to presumably continue his relationship with her on her ranch, but finds that she and a black friend have been regular lovers and that they have been violently murdered. The murderer is Charlotte's ex-boyfriend and football groupie Bob Boudreau, who has been stalking her throughout.

In the novel, Charlotte is a widow whose husband was an army officer who had been killed in Vietnam. Charlotte had told Phil that her husband had decided to resign his commission but had been killed in action while the request was being processed.

== See also ==
- Any Given Sunday
- List of American football films
