= Billy Lee Brammer =

American journalist (1929–1978)

- Born: April 21, 1929; Dallas, Texas, U.S.
- Died: February 11, 1978 (aged 48); Austin, Texas, U.S.
- Occupations: Novelist, journalist
- Spouse(s): Nadine Ellen Cannon (m. 1950; div. 1961) Dorothy Browne (m. 1963; div. 1969)
- Children: 3
- Writing career
- Subjects: Texas politics and politicians
- Notable work: The Gay Place

Billy Lee Brammer (April 21, 1929 – February 11, 1978) was an author, journalist, and political staffer in Texas and Washington, D.C.. He is best known for his set of three linked novellas titled The Gay Place.

== Life ==
Brammer was born April 21, 1929, in Dallas, Texas, where he graduated from Sunset High School. He attended the University of North Texas (then called North Texas State College), where he met Nadine Ellen Cannon, and they married on April 22, 1950.

Brammer graduated in 1952 with a degree in journalism. After working briefly as a reporter for the Corpus Christi Caller-Times, Brammer joined the American-Statesman (then called the Austin Statesman), where he won a press award for excellence in writing in 1952. In 1954, he won the Texas Associated Press Managing Editors Contest for a feature sports story written for the same paper.

In 1955, Brammer became an associate editor of the Texas Observer, a magazine of liberal dissent at a time when in Texas "the impulse for dissent scarcely existed." He attracted the attention of Texas Senator Lyndon Baines Johnson, who invited him to join his staff. While employed by Johnson in Washington, D.C., Brammer began working on The Gay Place, his first and only published novel, which is composed of three related novellas: The Flea Circus, Room Enough to Caper, and Country Pleasures. He sold the book to Houghton Mifflin in 1959.

Brammer left Johnson's staff to work for the economist Eliot Janeway. Time hired Brammer in 1960 to cover civil rights issues from the magazine's Atlanta office. Brammer left that job in 1961 (the year of the publication of The Gay Place) and never again held sustained employment. He began a sequel to The Gay Place titled "Fustian Days," but it never was completed. He was hired in 1973 as one of the first writers with Texas Monthly.

Brammer had three children – Sidney Gail, Shelby Ellen, and William Raoul – with Nadine before they divorced in 1961. In 1963, Brammer married Dorothy Browne; they were divorced in 1969. Brammer died of a methamphetamine overdose on February 11, 1978.

== Sources ==
- The Billy Lee Brammer Papers 1946-1993 (1.5 linear feet) are housed at the Wittliff Collections, Texas State University in San Marcos.
