= Lyndon B. Johnson =

President of the United States from 1963 to 1969

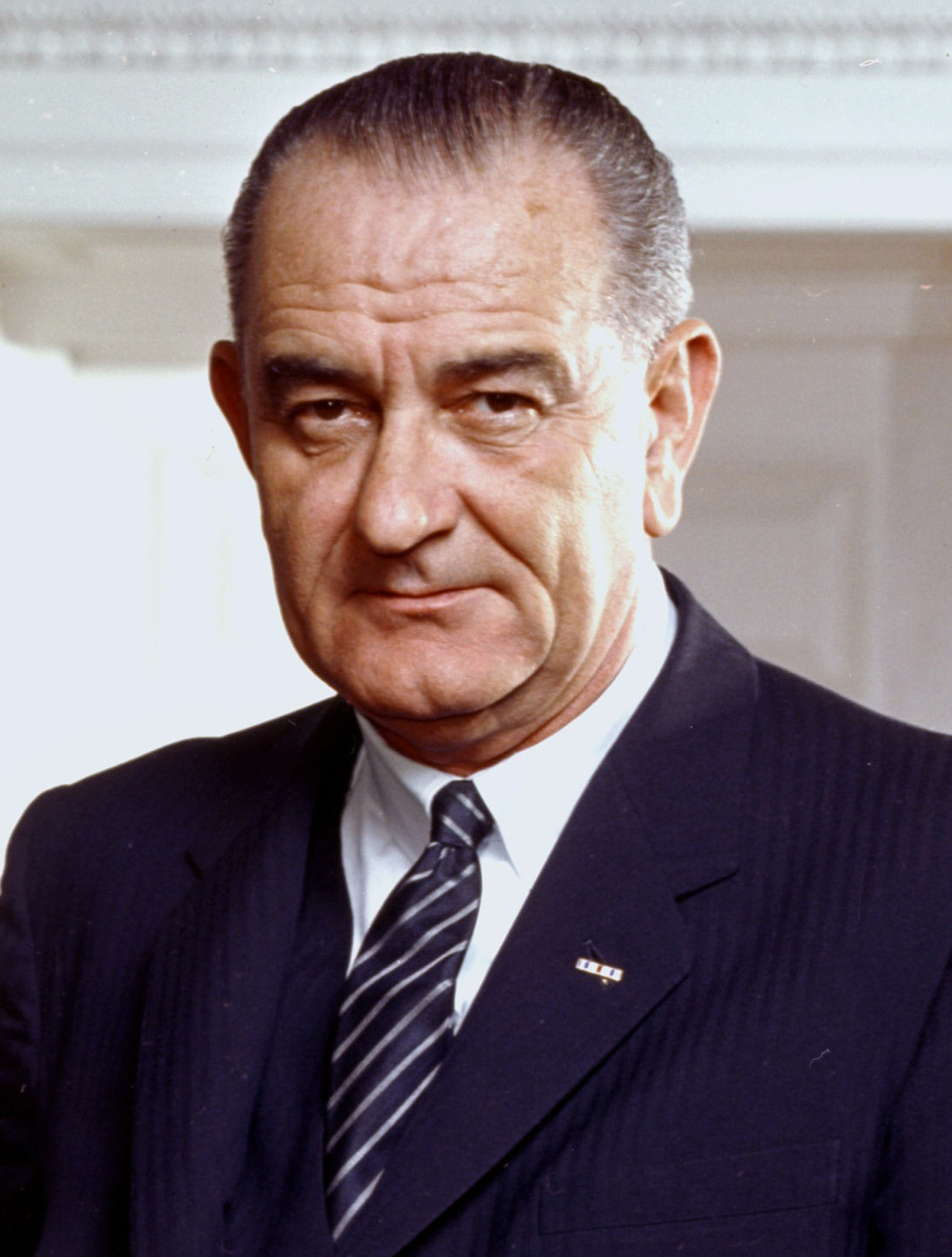
- Official portrait, 1964

36th President of the United States
- In office November 22, 1963 – January 20, 1969
- Vice President: Vacant (1963–1965) (Note: Johnson was vice president under John F. Kennedy and became president upon Kennedy's assassination on November 22, 1963. As this was prior to the adoption of the Twenty-fifth Amendment in 1967, a vacancy in the office of vice president was not filled until the next ensuing election and inauguration.); Hubert Humphrey (1965–1969)
- Preceded by: John F. Kennedy
- Succeeded by: Richard Nixon

37th Vice President of the United States
- In office January 20, 1961 – November 22, 1963
- President: John F. Kennedy
- Preceded by: Richard Nixon
- Succeeded by: Hubert Humphrey

United States Senator from Texas
- In office January 3, 1949 – January 3, 1961
- Preceded by: W. Lee O'Daniel
- Succeeded by: William A. Blakley
Senate positions
Senate Majority Leader
In office January 3, 1955 – January 3, 1961
Whip	Earle Clements; Mike Mansfield
Preceded by	William Knowland
Succeeded by	Mike Mansfield
Senate Minority Leader
In office January 3, 1953 – January 3, 1955
Whip	Earle Clements
Preceded by	Styles Bridges
Succeeded by	William Knowland
Chair of the Senate Democratic Caucus
In office January 3, 1953 – January 3, 1961
Preceded by	Ernest McFarland
Succeeded by	Mike Mansfield
Senate Majority Whip
In office January 3, 1951 – January 3, 1953
Leader	Ernest McFarland
Preceded by	Francis J. Myers
Succeeded by	Leverett Saltonstall

Member of the U.S. House of Representatives from Texas's 10th district
- In office April 10, 1937 – January 3, 1949
- Preceded by: James P. Buchanan
- Succeeded by: Homer Thornberry

Personal details
- Born: Lyndon Baines Johnson; August 27, 1908 Gillespie County, Texas, U.S.
- Died: January 22, 1973 (aged 64) Gillespie County, Texas, U.S.
- Resting place: Johnson Family Cemetery
- Party: Democratic
- Spouse: Claudia "Lady Bird" Taylor (m. 1934)
- Children: Lynda; Luci
- Parent: Samuel Ealy Johnson Jr. (father)
- Relatives: Johnson family
- Education: Southwest Texas State Teachers College (BS); Georgetown University Law Center (attended)
- Occupation: Politician; teacher
- Civilian awards: Presidential Medal of Freedom (posthumously, 1980)

Military service
- Allegiance: United States
- Branch/service: United States Navy; Naval Reserve
- Years of service: 1940–1941 (inactive); 1941–1942 (active); 1942–1964 (reserve)
- Rank: Commander
- Battles/wars: World War II; Invasion of Salamaua–Lae
- Military awards: Silver Star
- Johnson's voice Johnson on the passage of the Civil Rights Act of 1964; Recorded July 2, 1964

Lyndon Baines Johnson (August 27, 1908 – January 22, 1973), also known as LBJ, was the 36th president of the United States, serving from 1963 to 1969. The 37th vice president, he assumed the presidency following the assassination of John F. Kennedy. Johnson was a Southern Democrat who represented Texas in both houses of the U.S. Congress and earned a reputation as a talented and persuasive legislator. His presidency was marked by the passage of landmark civil rights legislation, the creation of Great Society programs such as Medicare and Medicaid, and a significant escalation in U.S. involvement in the Vietnam War.

Born in Stonewall, Texas, Johnson worked as a teacher and a congressional aide before winning election to the U.S. House of Representatives in 1937. In 1948, he was controversially declared the winner in the Democratic primary for the U.S. Senate election in Texas before winning the general election. He became Senate majority whip in 1951, Senate Democratic leader in 1953 and majority leader in 1954. Senator Kennedy bested Johnson and his other rivals for the 1960 Democratic presidential nomination before surprising many by offering to make Johnson his vice presidential running mate in order to balance the ticket and appeal to Southern voters. The Kennedy–Johnson ticket won the general election. Johnson assumed the presidency in 1963, after Kennedy was assassinated. The following year, Johnson won reelection to the presidency in a landslide, winning the largest share of the popular vote for the Democratic Party in history.

Johnson's domestic policy agenda known as the Great Society was aimed at expanding civil rights, public broadcasting, access to health care, aid to education and the arts, urban and rural development, consumer protection, environmentalism, and public services. He sought to create better living conditions for low-income Americans by spearheading the War on Poverty. As part of these efforts, Johnson signed the Social Security Amendments of 1965, which resulted in the creation of Medicare and Medicaid. Johnson made the Apollo Moon landing program a national priority; enacted the Higher Education Act of 1965 which established federally insured student loans; and signed the Immigration and Nationality Act of 1965 which laid the groundwork for U.S. immigration policy today. Johnson's civil rights legacy was shaped by the Civil Rights Act of 1964, the Voting Rights Act of 1965, and the Civil Rights Act of 1968. Due to his domestic agenda, Johnson's presidency marked the peak of modern American liberalism in the 20th century. Johnson's foreign policy prioritized containment of communism, including in the ongoing Vietnam War.

Johnson began his presidency with near-universal support, but his approval declined throughout his presidency as the public became frustrated with both the Vietnam War and domestic unrest, including race riots, increasing public skepticism with his reports and policies (coined the credibility gap), and increasing crime. Johnson initially sought to run for re-election in 1968; however, following disappointing results in the New Hampshire primary, he withdrew his candidacy. Johnson retired to his Texas ranch and kept a low public profile until he died in 1973. Public opinion and academic assessments of Johnson's legacy have fluctuated greatly. Historians and scholars rank Johnson in the upper tier for his accomplishments regarding domestic policy. His administration enacted several major laws that brought significant changes in the areas of civil rights, health care, welfare, and education. Conversely, Johnson is heavily criticized for his foreign policy, namely escalating American involvement in the Vietnam War.

== Early life and education ==
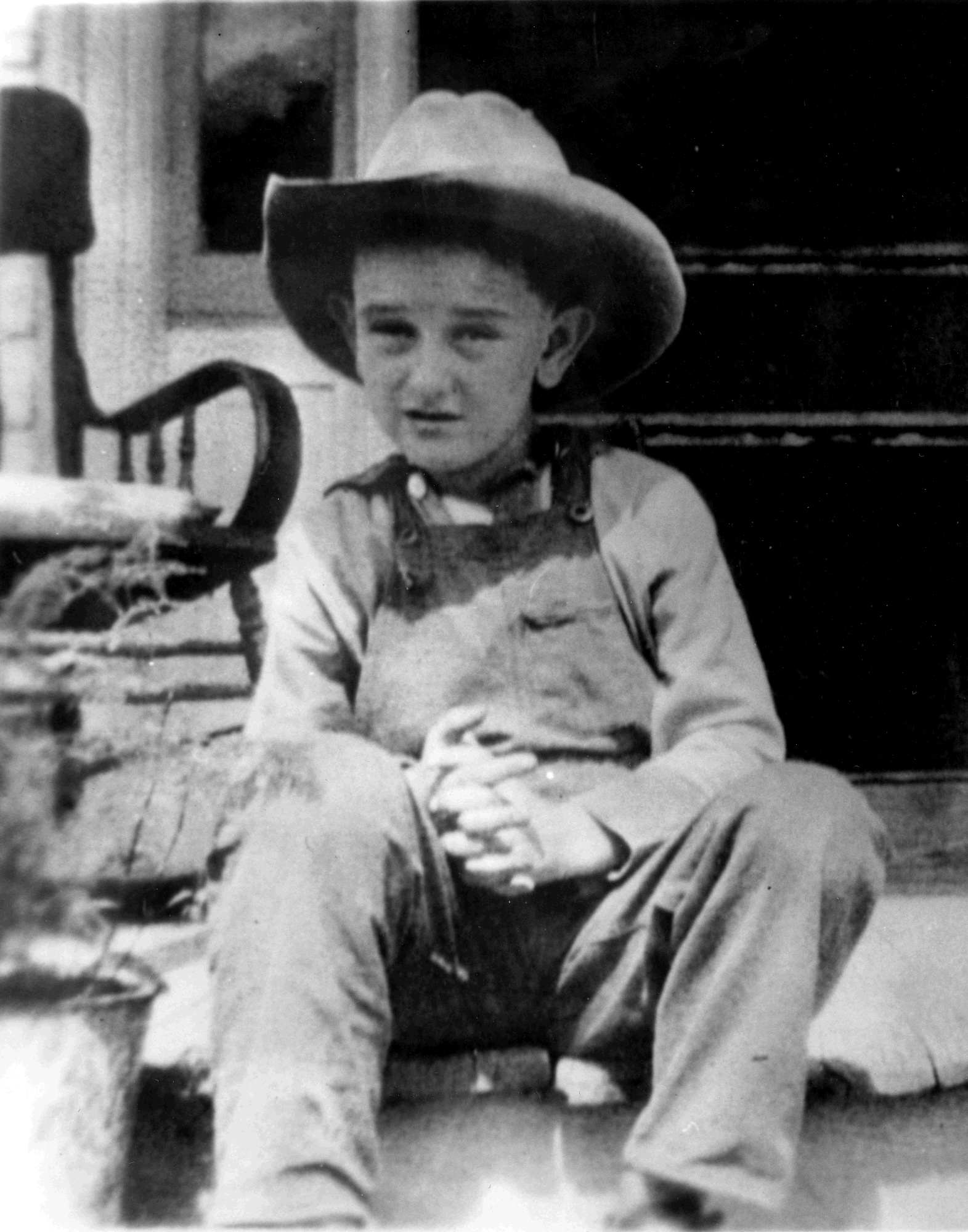
Johnson at age 7, wearing his trademark cowboy hat, at his childhood farmhouse near Stonewall, Texas, in 1915

Lyndon Baines Johnson was born on August 27, 1908, near Stonewall, Texas, in a small farmhouse on the Pedernales River. He was the eldest of five children born to Samuel Ealy Johnson Jr. and Rebekah Baines. Johnson was not given a name until he was three months old, as his parents could not agree on a name that both liked. Finally, he was named after "criminal lawyer—a county lawyer" W. C. Linden, whom his father liked; his mother agreed on the condition of spelling it as Lyndon. Johnson had one brother, Sam Houston Johnson, and three sisters, Rebekah, Josefa, and Lucia. Through his mother, he was a great-grandson of Baptist clergyman George Washington Baines.

Johnson's paternal grandfather, Samuel Ealy Johnson Sr., was raised Baptist and for a time was a member of the Christian Church (Disciples of Christ). In his later years, Samuel Sr. became a Christadelphian; Samuel Jr. also joined the Christadelphian Church toward the end of his life. Johnson was influenced in his positive attitude toward Jews by the religious beliefs that his family, especially his grandfather, had shared with him.

Johnson grew up poor, with his father losing a great deal of money. Biographer Robert Caro described him as being raised "in a land without electricity, where the soil was so rocky that it was hard to earn a living from it."

In school, Johnson was a talkative youth who was elected president of his 11th-grade class. He graduated in 1924 from Johnson City High School, where he participated in public speaking, debate, and baseball. At 15, Johnson was the youngest in his class. Pressured by his parents to attend college, he enrolled at a "sub college" of Southwest Texas State Teachers College (SWTSTC) in the summer of 1924, where students from unaccredited high schools could take the 12th-grade courses needed for admission to college. He left the school just weeks after his arrival and decided to move to California. He worked at his cousin's legal practice and in odd jobs before returning to Texas, where he worked as a day laborer.

In 1926, Johnson enrolled at SWTSTC. He worked his way through school, participated in debate and campus politics, and edited the school newspaper, The College Star. The college years refined his skills of persuasion and political organization. For nine months, from 1928 to 1929, Johnson paused his studies to teach Mexican–American children at the segregated Welhausen School in Cotulla, Texas, 90 miles (140 km) south of San Antonio. The job helped him to save money to complete his education, and he graduated in 1930 with a Bachelor of Science in history and his certificate of qualification as a high school teacher. He briefly taught at Pearsall High School in Pearsall, Texas before taking a position teaching public speaking at Sam Houston High School in Houston.

When he returned to San Marcos in 1965, after signing the Higher Education Act of 1965, Johnson reminisced:

I shall never forget the faces of the boys and the girls in that little Welhausen Mexican School, and I remember even yet the pain of realizing and knowing then that college was closed to practically every one of those children because they were too poor. And I think it was then that I made up my mind that this nation could never rest while the door to knowledge remained closed to any American.

== Entry into politics ==
After Richard M. Kleberg won a 1931 special election to represent Texas in the United States House of Representatives, he appointed Johnson as his legislative secretary. This marked Johnson's formal introduction to politics. Johnson secured the position on the recommendation of his father and that of state senator Welly Hopkins, for whom Johnson had campaigned in 1930. Kleberg had little interest in the day-to-day duties of a Congressman, instead delegating them to Johnson. After Franklin D. Roosevelt won the 1932 U.S. presidential election, Johnson became a lifelong supporter of Roosevelt's New Deal. Johnson was elected speaker of the "Little Congress", a group of Congressional aides, where he cultivated Congressmen, newspapermen, and lobbyists. Johnson's friends soon included aides to President Roosevelt as well as fellow Texans such as vice president John Nance Garner and congressman Sam Rayburn.

In 1935, Johnson was hired as Texas state administrator of the National Youth Administration (NYA). The job allowed him to travel around Texas seeking financial sponsors for NYA construction projects. Within six months, 18,000 young Texans were working on roads, parks, schools, and other public buildings. He resigned two years later to run for Congress. A notoriously tough boss, Johnson often demanded long workdays and work on weekends. He was described by friends, fellow politicians, and historians as motivated by lust for power and control. As Caro observes, "Johnson's ambition was uncommon – in the degree to which it was unencumbered by even the slightest excess weight of ideology, of philosophy, of principles, of beliefs."

== U.S. House of Representatives (1937–1949) ==
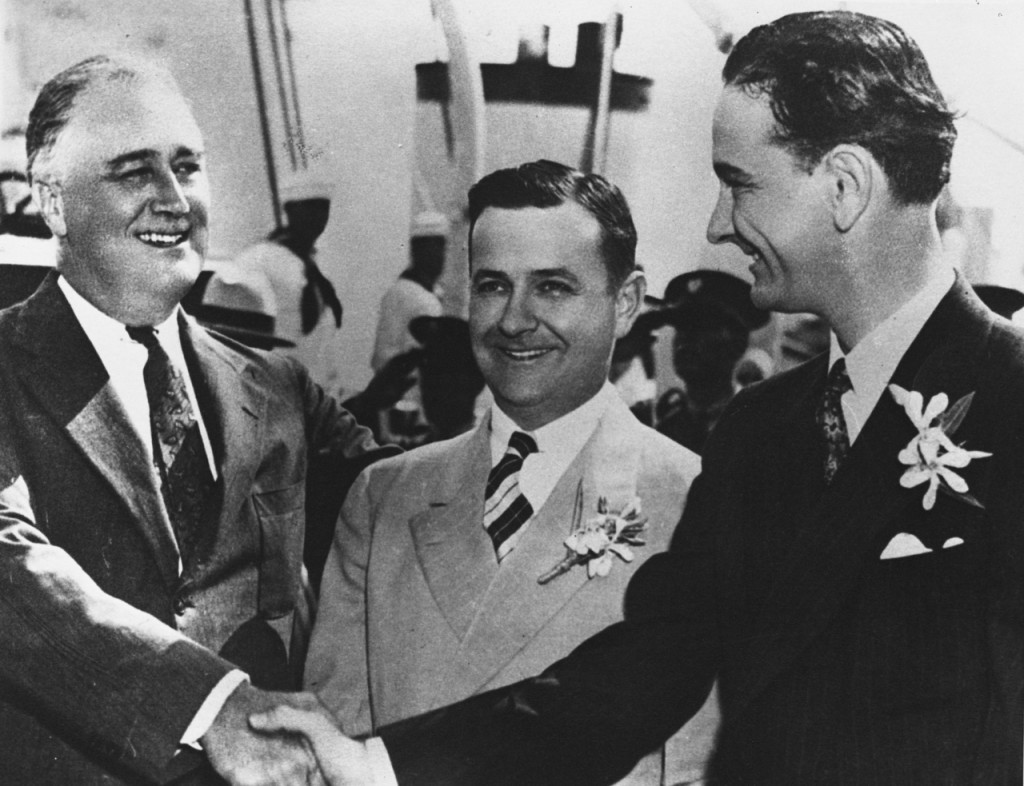
Johnson (right) with President Franklin D. Roosevelt (left) and Texas governor James Burr V Allred (center) in 1937; he later used an edited version of this photo with Allred airbrushed out in his unsuccessful 1941 senatorial campaign.

In 1937, after the death of 13-term congressman James P. Buchanan, Johnson successfully campaigned in a special election for Texas's 10th congressional district, which included Austin and the surrounding Texas Hill Country. He ran on a New Deal platform and was effectively aided by his wife. He served as a U.S. Representative from April 10, 1937, to January 3, 1949. President Roosevelt found Johnson to be a political ally and conduit for information, particularly regarding the internal politics of Texas and the machinations of Vice President John Nance Garner and House Speaker Sam Rayburn. As a member of the House Naval Affairs Committee, Johnson helped plan a huge naval air training base at Corpus Christi, Texas. He also helped establish shipbuilding sites at Houston and Orange, Texas; and a Navy Reserve station in Dallas.

Johnson successfully sponsored many federal projects for his home district. One was a program that provided cheap electricity for farmers under the new Rural Electrification Administration (REA), and he secured approval to complete the hydroelectric Mansfield Dam on the Colorado River near Austin. He also sponsored projects that gave his Texas district soil conservation, public housing, lower railroad freight rates, and expanded credit for loans to farmers. He steered the projects towards contractors he knew, such as Herman and George Brown, who financed much of Johnson's future career.

During this time Johnson maintained a hostile position towards civil rights legislation like almost all other Southern Democrat legislators; voting against anti-lynching legislation, anti-poll tax legislation and the Fair Employment Practice Committee.

=== 1941 U.S. Senate election ===
In April 1941, U.S. Senator Morris Sheppard of Texas died, triggering a special election. Texas law allowed Johnson to run without giving up his House seat. The election had no primaries or runoff, forcing Johnson to compete against multiple Democrats, including Governor W. Lee "Pappy" O'Daniel.

Johnson campaigned aggressively, emphasizing his ties to President Roosevelt, and initially appeared to be leading. However, after late returns came in, O'Daniel narrowly won by 1,311 votes. In The Path to Power, Johnson biographer Robert Caro argues that the election results were manipulated in O'Daniel's favor by lobbyists from Texas' alcohol industry. O'Daniel was a staunch prohibitionist, and as Governor, he had proposed a bill preventing the sale of alcohol within ten miles of a military base; Caro notes how business interests feared the passing of this bill, as preparations for World War II had brought thousands of young soldiers into the region. To prevent the passing of this bill, lobbyists sought to elect O'Daniel to the Senate to place the "wet" lieutenant governor Coke Stevenson in the governorship, and hence rigged ballots in East Texas, swinging the election in O'Daniel's favor. Johnson ultimately lost by just 0.23% of the vote.

Though defeated, Johnson retained his House seat and political network, including support from South Texas political boss George Berham Parr. When O'Daniel declined to seek re-election in 1948, Johnson prepared for another Senate run, this time carefully managing vote tallies. He would go on to win the 1948 Democratic primary by just 87 votes.

=== Active military duty (1941–1942) ===
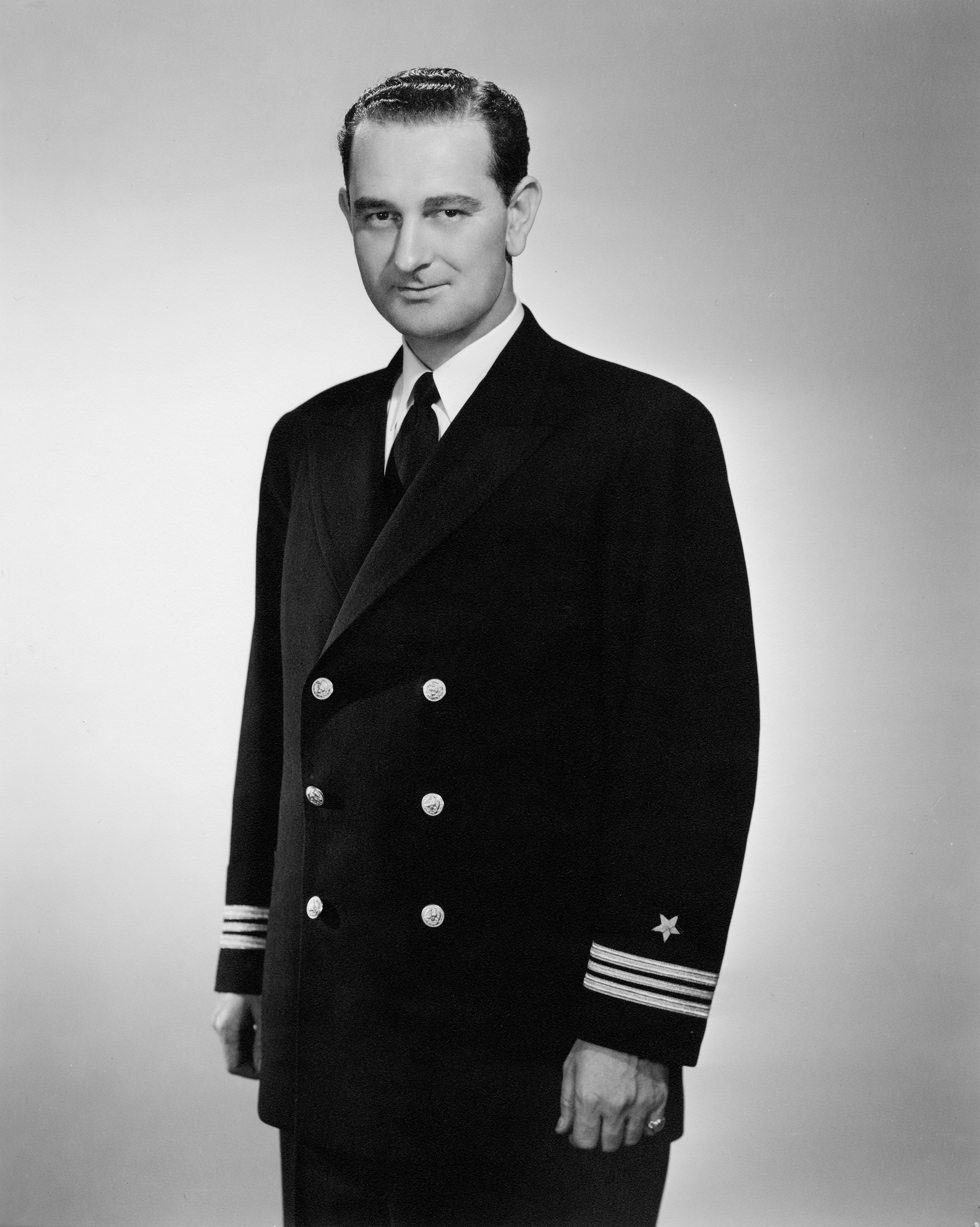
Johnson as a lieutenant commander in the United States Navy Reserve in March 1942

Johnson was a member of the U.S. Naval Reserve when Japan attacked Pearl Harbor in December 1941. Two days after the attack, he requested an indefinite leave of absence and applied for active duty, making him one of the first members of Congress to volunteer for an active military role.

Johnson was first ordered to the Office of the Chief of Naval Operations to assess the production and manpower problems that were slowing the manufacture of ships and planes. In May 1942, he was appointed President Roosevelt's personal representative to the Navy and was sent on a survey mission of the Pacific theater of combat. Stationed in Australia and New Zealand, it was his duty to find the underreported problems facing U.S. troops in the Pacific and report this firsthand information to Roosevelt.

On June 9, 1942, Johnson received the Silver Star from General Douglas MacArthur for gallantry in action during an aerial combat mission over hostile positions in New Guinea. Though accounts differ, Johnson's aircraft, a B-26 bomber, reportedly turned back before reaching the target due to mechanical trouble. Johnson's biographer Robert Caro was quoted as saying "I think that the weight of the evidence at this moment is that the plane was attacked by Zeroes and that he was cool under fire", but also "The fact is, LBJ never got within sight of Japanese forces. His combat experience was a myth."

Johnson served in the Pacific through July 1942. He was released from his military active duty after President Roosevelt recalled all active duty legislators back to Washington, D.C. In addition to the Silver Star, Johnson received the Asiatic-Pacific Campaign Medal, and the World War II Victory Medal.

== U.S. Senate (1949–1961) ==
=== 1948 U.S. Senate election ===
Results of the Democratic runoff primary in the 1948 U.S. Senate election in Texas by county. Johnson squeaked out a controversial victory by 87 votes. Johnson counties appear in blue, and Stevenson counties in green. Johnson: Johnson—>90%; Johnson—80–90%; Johnson—70–80%; Johnson—60–70%; Johnson—50–60%; Stevenson: Stevenson—50–60%; Stevenson—60–70%; Stevenson—70–80%; Stevenson—80–90%; Stevenson—>90%; No vote: No vote

In 1948, Johnson again ran for the U.S. Senate and won the general election after being declared winner in a highly controversial Democratic Party primary election against the well-known former governor Coke Stevenson. Johnson drew crowds to fairgrounds with his rented Sikorsky S-51 helicopter, dubbed "The Johnson City Windmill". He raised money to flood the state with campaign circulars and won over conservatives by casting doubts on Stevenson's support for the Taft–Hartley Act (curbing union power). Stevenson came in first in the primary but lacked a majority, so a runoff election was held; Johnson campaigned harder, while Stevenson's efforts slumped due to a lack of funds.

The runoff vote count, handled by the Democratic State Central Committee, took a week. Johnson was announced the winner by 87 votes out of 988,295, an extremely narrow margin. However, Johnson's victory was based on 200 "patently fraudulent" ballots reported six days after the election from Box 13 in Jim Wells County, in an area dominated by political boss George Berham Parr. The added names were in alphabetical order and written with the same pen and handwriting, at the end of the list of voters. Some on this part of the list insisted that they had not voted that day. Election judge Luis Salas said in 1977 that he had certified 202 fraudulent ballots, 200 for Johnson, and two for Stevenson. Robert Caro made the case in his 1990 book that Johnson had stolen the election in Jim Wells County, and that there were thousands of fraudulent votes in other counties as well, including 10,000 votes switched in San Antonio. The Democratic State Central Committee voted to certify Johnson's nomination by a majority of one (29–28). The state Democratic convention upheld Johnson. Stevenson went to court, eventually taking his case before the U.S. Supreme Court, but with timely help from his friend and future U.S. Supreme Court Justice Abe Fortas, Johnson prevailed on the basis that jurisdiction over naming a nominee rested with the party, not the federal government. Johnson soundly defeated Republican Jack Porter in the general election in November and went to Washington, permanently dubbed "Landslide Lyndon". Johnson, dismissive of his critics, happily adopted the nickname.

=== Freshman senator to majority whip ===
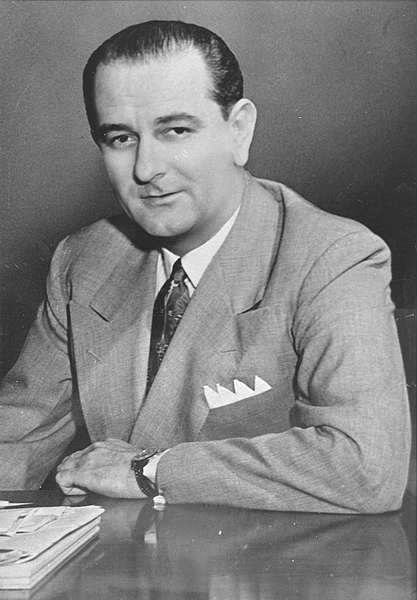
Johnson's United States Senate portrait in the 1950s

During his two terms in the Senate, Johnson drifted rightward. He felt he had to tread carefully lest he offend politically powerful conservative oil and gas interests in Texas, and in part to curry favor with the chamber's powerful southern chairmen, most notably Senator Richard Russell, Democrat from Georgia and leader of the Southern Caucus within the conservative coalition that dominated the Senate. With Russell's support, Johnson won election as Democratic whip in 1951, serving in this capacity until 1953. While serving as whip, Johnson increased his ability to persuade people to reach agreement.

As a member of the Senate Committee on Interstate and Foreign Commerce, Johnson was chairman of the Senate subcommittee that refused the re-nomination of Leland Olds—who was opposed by Texas oil and gas interests—as chairman of the Federal Power Commission (FPC) on the grounds that he had been sympathetic towards communism. As a member of the FPC, Olds had played a key role in the development of federal regulation of the natural gas industry.

President Truman favored federal control of tidelands oil deposits off the Texas coast. Privately, Johnson told friends that he favored federal control, but in public he staunchly defended states' rights. In 1951–52, Johnson helped pass bills granting 47 states control over 3 miles of offshore lands and Texas, 10.5 miles. Truman vetoed the bills, calling them "robbery in broad daylight".

Johnson was appointed to the Senate Armed Services Committee, and became increasingly concerned with the country's military preparedness in the Cold War with the Soviet Union. He became chairman of the Senate Preparedness Investigating Subcommittee, and conducted investigations of defense costs and efficiency. After the Korean War began in 1950, he called for more troops and for improved weapons. Biographer Caro wrote that Johnson was obsessed with having all subcommittee reports be unanimous, maneuvering frequently to gain the backing of all the Republicans. He used his political influence in the Senate to receive broadcast licenses from the Federal Communications Commission in his wife's name.

=== Senate Democratic leader ===
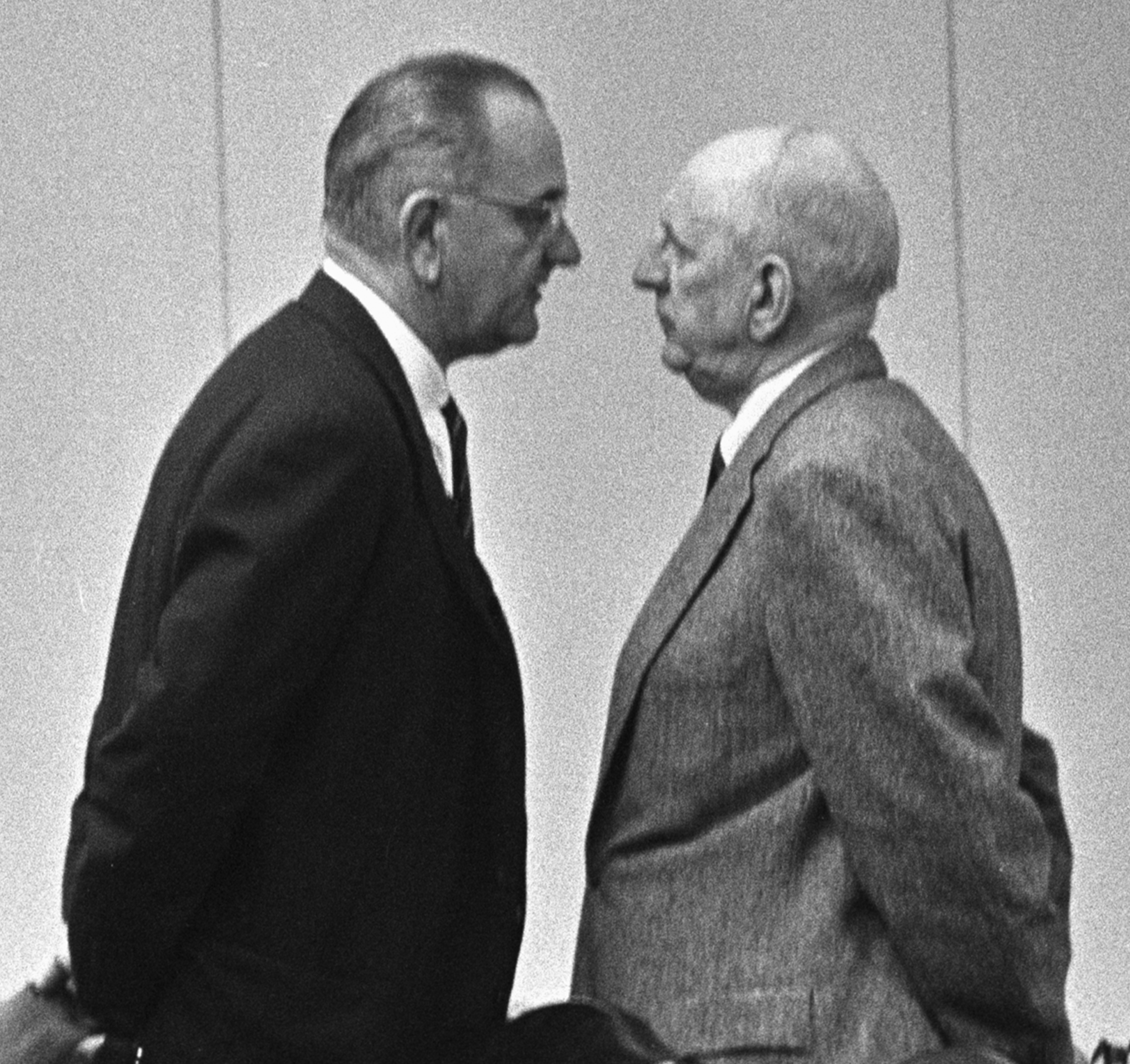
President Johnson giving "The Treatment" to U.S. Senator Richard Russell Jr. in 1963

In the 1952 elections, Republicans won a majority in both the House and Senate. In January 1953, Johnson was chosen by his fellow Democrats as Senate Minority Leader; he became the most junior senator ever elected to this position. He reformed the seniority system so that Democratic senators, including freshmen, were more likely to receive a committee assignment that closely aligned with their expertise rather than an assignment based solely on their seniority.

==== Senate Majority Leader ====
In 1954, Johnson was re-elected to the Senate and, with Democrats winning the majority in the Senate, he became majority leader. President Dwight D. Eisenhower found Johnson more cooperative than the Senate Republican leader, William F. Knowland of California. Particularly on foreign policy, Johnson offered bipartisan support to the president.

Historians Caro and Robert Dallek consider Johnson the most effective Senate majority leader ever. He was unusually proficient at gathering information. One biographer suggests he was "the greatest intelligence gatherer Washington has ever known", discovering exactly where every senator stood on issues, his philosophy and prejudices, his strengths and weaknesses, and what it took to get his vote. Bobby Baker claimed that Johnson would occasionally send senators on NATO trips so they were absent and unable to cast dissenting votes. Central to Johnson's control was "The Treatment", described by two journalists:

The Treatment could last ten minutes or four hours. It came, enveloping its target, at the Johnson Ranch swimming pool, in one of Johnson's offices, in the Senate cloakroom, on the floor of the Senate itself – wherever Johnson might find a fellow Senator within his reach. Its tone could be supplication, accusation, cajolery, exuberance, scorn, tears, complaint, and the hint of threat. It was all of these together. It ran the gamut of human emotions. Its velocity was breathtaking and it was all in one direction. Interjections from the target were rare. Johnson anticipated them before they could be spoken. He moved in close, his face a scant millimeter from his target, his eyes widening and narrowing, his eyebrows rising and falling. From his pockets poured clippings, memos, statistics. Mimicry, humor, and the genius of analogy made The Treatment an almost hypnotic experience and rendered the target stunned and helpless.

In 1956, during the Suez Crisis, Johnson tried to prevent the U.S. government from criticizing Israel for its invasion of the Sinai Peninsula. Along with much of the rest of the nation, Johnson was appalled by the threat of possible Soviet domination of space exploration implied by the launch of Sputnik 1, the first artificial Earth satellite, and used his influence to ensure passage of the National Aeronautics and Space Act of 1958, which established NASA. Johnson helped establish the Senate Aeronautical and Space Committee, and made himself its first chairman.

During his tenure as Majority Leader, Johnson did not sign the 1956 Southern Manifesto, and shepherded the Civil Rights Acts of 1957 and 1960 to passage—the first civil rights bills to pass Congress since the Enforcement Acts and the Civil Rights Act of 1875 during Reconstruction. Johnson negotiated a middle course between Northern liberal senators and the Southern bloc of senators who had opposed such legislation by removing key enforcement provisions, such as Title III, which authorized the attorney general to initiate civil action for preventive relief in a wide range of civil rights matters. Being a Southerner was seen as an impossible barrier for a presidential candidate and towards the end of his Senate career as well as not signing the Southern Manifesto, he distanced himself further from the Southern Caucus in 1959 by joining the Democrat's Western regional conference.

== Campaigns of 1960 ==
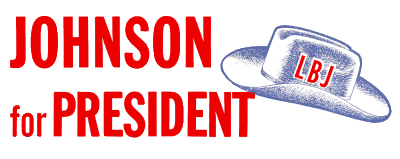
1960 presidential campaign logo

In 1960, Johnson's success in the Senate rendered him a potential Democratic presidential candidate. James H. Rowe repeatedly urged Johnson to launch a campaign in early 1959, but Johnson thought it was better to wait, thinking that Senator John F. Kennedy's candidacy would create a division in the ranks that could then be exploited. Johnson's strategy was to sit out the primaries and to rely on his legislative record as Senate Majority Leader, the support of Southern Democrats, and the favors owed by Democratic senators to him and by Democratic representatives to his close ally Sam Rayburn, the Speaker of the House. In July 1960, Johnson finally entered the campaign. Johnson's late entry, coupled with his reluctance to leave Washington, D.C., allowed rival John F. Kennedy to secure a substantial early lead in securing support from Democratic state party officials. Johnson underestimated Kennedy's endearing charm and intelligence in comparison to his perceived crude and wheeling-dealing "Landslide Lyndon" style. Caro suggests that Johnson's hesitancy to enter the race resulted from his fear of losing.

Johnson attempted in vain to capitalize on Kennedy's youth, poor health, and failure to take a position regarding McCarthyism. He had formed a "Stop Kennedy" coalition with Adlai Stevenson, Stuart Symington, and Hubert Humphrey, but it proved a failure. Despite Johnson having the support of established Democrats and the party leadership, this did not translate into popular approval. Johnson received 409 votes on the only ballot at the Democratic convention to Kennedy's 806, and so the convention nominated Kennedy. Tip O'Neill was a representative from Kennedy's home state of Massachusetts at that time, and he recalled that Johnson approached him at the convention and said, "Tip, I know you have to support Kennedy at the start, but I'd like to have you with me on the second ballot." O'Neill replied, "Senator, there's not going to be any second ballot."

=== Vice presidential nomination ===
After much discussion with party leaders and others, Kennedy offered Johnson the vice presidential nomination at the Los Angeles Biltmore Hotel on July 14, the morning after Kennedy was nominated, and Johnson accepted. From that point to the actual nomination that evening, several facts are in dispute, including whether convention chairman LeRoy Collins' had the two-thirds majority required to begin the convention's proceedings. Kennedy's choice of Johnson as his running mate was intended to attract Southern votes. Kennedy was a liberal Bostonian and a Roman Catholic. Johnson was more conservative, a Southerner, and a member of the Disciples of Christ. Nevertheless, labor leaders were unanimous in their opposition to Johnson. AFL-CIO president George Meany called Johnson "the arch-foe of labor", and Illinois AFL-CIO president Reuben Soderstrom asserted Kennedy had "made chumps out of leaders of the American labor movement".

=== Re-election to U.S. Senate ===
At the same time as his vice presidential run, Johnson also sought a third term in the U.S. Senate. According to Robert Caro:

Johnson won an election for both the vice presidency of the United States, on the Kennedy–Johnson ticket, and for a third term as senator (he had Texas law changed to allow him to run for both offices). When he won the vice presidency, he made arrangements to resign from the Senate, as he was required to do under federal law, as soon as it convened on January 3, 1961.

Johnson was re-elected senator with 1,306,605 votes (58 percent) to Republican John Tower's 927,653 (41.1 percent). He did not take office for his third term, however, being Vice President-elect at the time. Fellow Democrat William A. Blakley was appointed to replace Johnson, but lost a special election in May 1961 to Tower.

== Vice presidency (1961–1963) ==
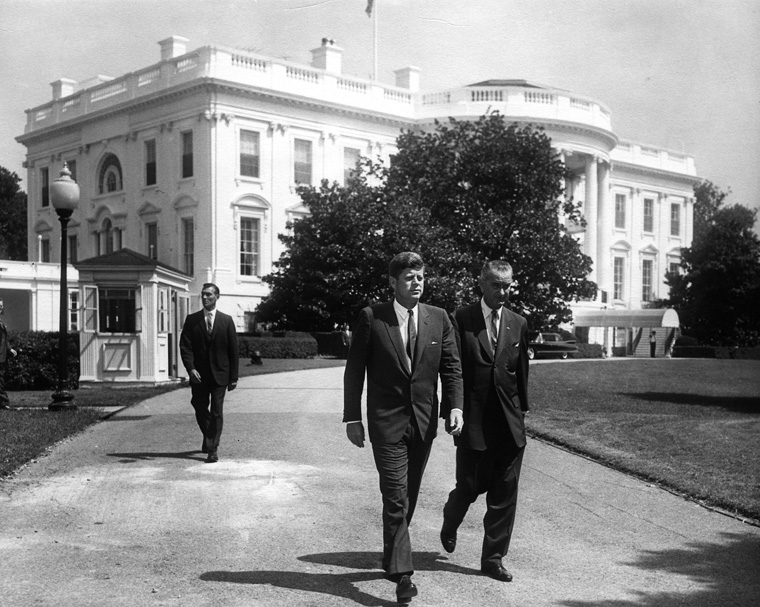
President John F. Kennedy and Vice President Johnson outside the White House in August 1961

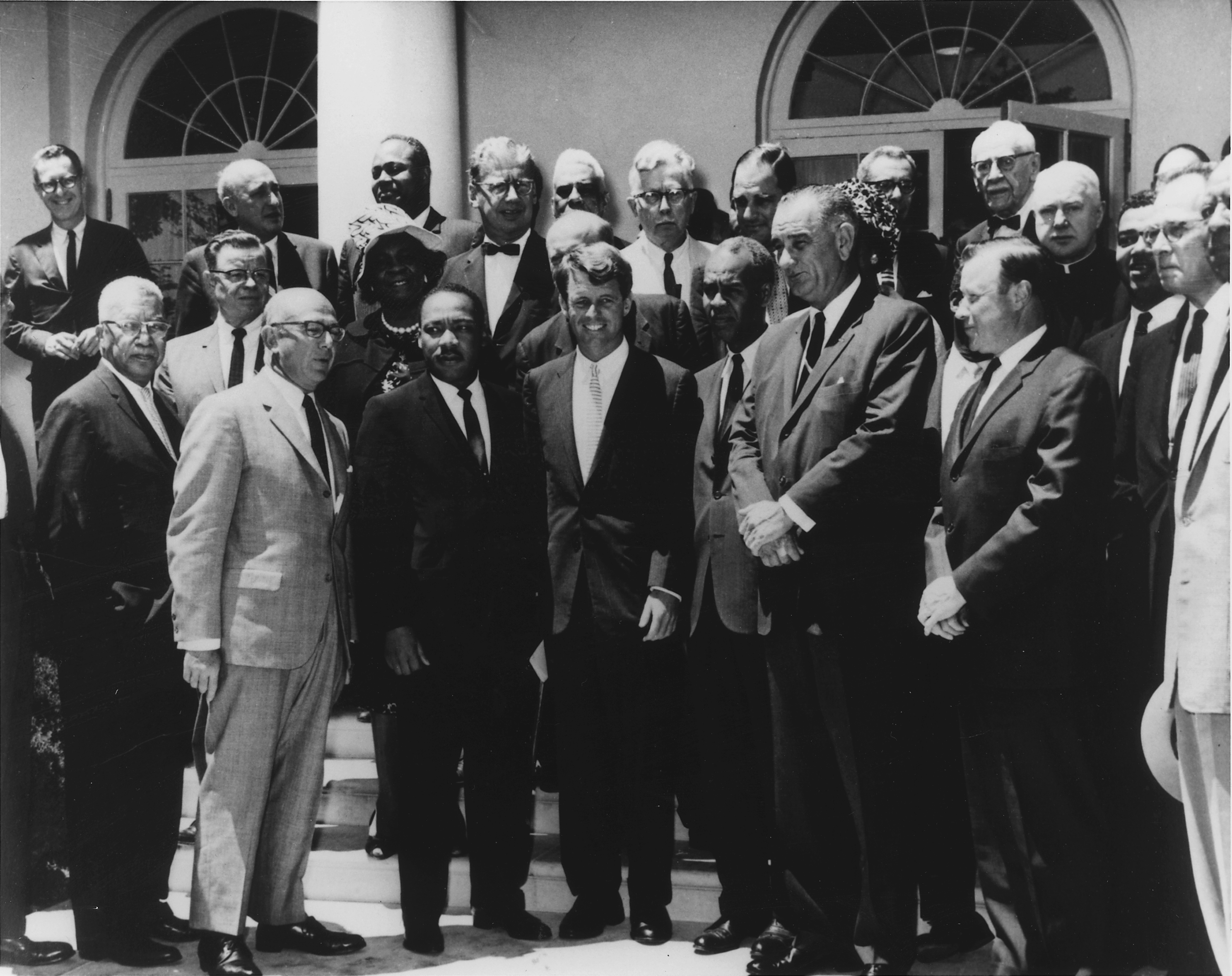
Vice President Johnson and Attorney General Robert Kennedy meeting with civil rights leaders at the White House on June 22, 1963

After the election, Johnson was concerned about the traditionally ineffective nature of his new office and sought authority not allotted to him as vice president. He initially sought a transfer of the authority of Senate majority leader to the vice presidency, since that office made him president of the Senate, but faced vehement opposition from the Democratic Caucus, including members whom he had counted as his supporters.

Johnson sought to increase his influence within the executive branch. He drafted an executive order for Kennedy's signature, granting Johnson "general supervision" over matters of national security, and requiring all government agencies to "cooperate fully with the vice president in the carrying out of these assignments". Kennedy's response was to sign a non-binding letter requesting Johnson to "review" national security policies instead. Kennedy similarly turned down early requests from Johnson to be given an office adjacent to the Oval Office and to employ a full-time staff within the White House. In 1961, Kennedy appointed Johnson's friend Sarah T. Hughes to a federal judgeship. Johnson tried but failed to have Hughes nominated at the beginning of his vice presidency. House Speaker Sam Rayburn wangled the appointment from Kennedy in exchange for support of an administration bill.

With the exception of Kennedy himself, other members of the Kennedy White House were openly contemptuous of Johnson, including the president's brother, Attorney General Robert F. Kennedy, and they ridiculed his comparatively brusque and crude manner. Then Congressman Tip O'Neill recalled that the Kennedy staffers "had a disdain for Johnson that they didn't even try to hide.... They actually took pride in snubbing him."

Kennedy made efforts to keep Johnson busy and informed, telling aides, "I can't afford to have my vice president, who knows every reporter in Washington, going around saying we're all screwed up, so we're going to keep him happy." Kennedy appointed him to jobs such as the head of the President's Committee on Equal Employment Opportunities, where Johnson worked with African Americans and other minorities. Kennedy may have intended this to remain a nominal position, but Taylor Branch contends in his 1998 book Pillar of Fire that Johnson pushed the Kennedy administration's actions further and faster for civil rights than Kennedy originally intended.

Johnson went on multiple minor diplomatic missions, which gave him some insights into global issues and opportunities for self-promotion. During his visit to West Berlin on August 19–20, 1961, Johnson sought to calm Berliners who were outraged by the building of the Berlin Wall. He also attended Cabinet and National Security Council meetings. Kennedy gave Johnson control over all presidential appointments involving Texas, and appointed him chairman of the President's Ad Hoc Committee for Science.

Kennedy also appointed Johnson Chairman of the National Aeronautics and Space Council. The Soviets beat the United States with the first crewed spaceflight in April 1961, and Kennedy gave Johnson the task of evaluating the U.S. space program and recommending a project that would allow the United States to catch up or beat the Soviets. Johnson recommended that the United States gain the leadership role by committing to landing an American on the Moon in the 1960s. Kennedy assigned priority to the space program, but Johnson's appointment provided cover in case of a failure.

In August 1963, Johnson was touched by a Senate scandal when Bobby Baker, the Secretary to the Majority Leader of the Senate and a protégé of Johnson's, came under investigation by the Senate Rules Committee for alleged bribery and financial malfeasance. One witness alleged that Baker arranged for the witness to give kickbacks for the Vice President. Baker resigned in October, and the investigation did not expand to Johnson. The negative publicity, however, fed rumors in Washington circles that Kennedy was planning on dropping Johnson from the Democratic ticket in the 1964 presidential election. However, on October 31, 1963, a reporter asked if he intended and expected to retain Johnson on the ticket. Kennedy replied, "Yes to both those questions." There is little doubt that Robert Kennedy and Johnson hated each other, yet John and Robert Kennedy agreed that dropping Johnson from the ticket could produce heavy losses in the South.

== Presidency (1963–1969) ==
=== Succession ===
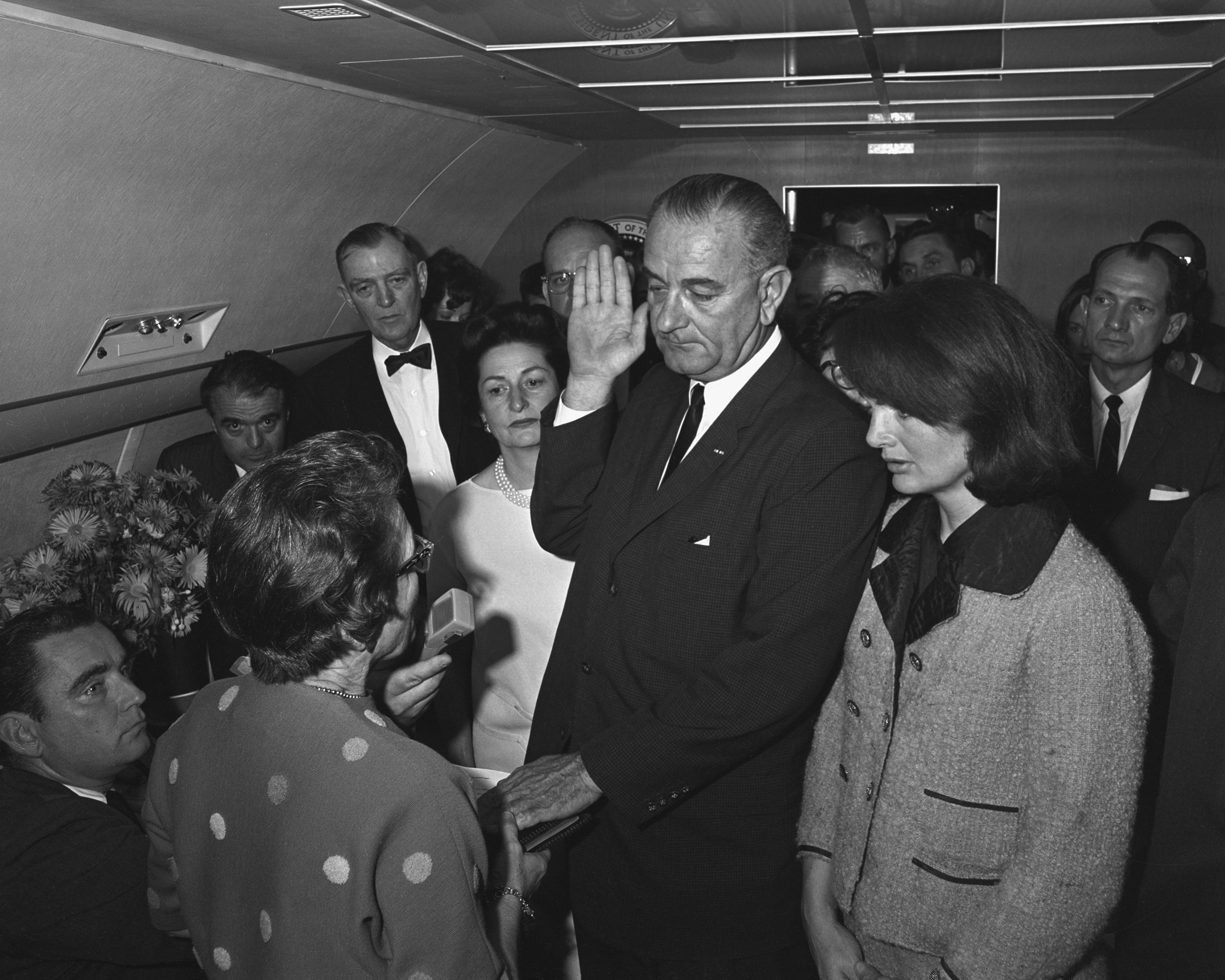
Johnson is sworn in as president aboard Air Force One at Dallas Love Field two hours and eight minutes following Kennedy's assassination as Mrs. Johnson and Mrs. Kennedy look on.

President Kennedy was assassinated on November 22, 1963, in Dallas, Texas. Later that day, Johnson took the presidential oath of office aboard Air Force One. Cecil Stoughton's iconic photograph of Johnson taking the oath of office as Mrs. Kennedy looks on is the most famous photo ever taken aboard a presidential aircraft. Johnson was sworn in by District Court judge Sarah T. Hughes and is to date the only president in U.S. history to be sworn in by a woman.

Johnson was convinced of the need to make an immediate show of transition of power after the assassination to provide stability to a grieving nation. He and the Secret Service, not knowing whether the assassin acted alone or as part of a broader conspiracy, felt compelled to return rapidly to Washington, D.C.; this was greeted by some with assertions that he was in too much haste to assume power. In response to the public demand for answers and the growing number of conspiracy theories, Johnson established a commission headed by Chief Justice Earl Warren, known as the Warren Commission, to investigate Kennedy's assassination. The commission conducted research and hearings and unanimously concluded that Lee Harvey Oswald acted alone in the assassination. Although Johnson publicly supported the findings of the Warren Commission, privately he expressed skepticism of its conclusions. In 1967 he told his advisor W. Marvin Watson that he was convinced the CIA was in some way involved in the assassination, and shortly before his death, he told his speechwriter Leo Janos "I never believed that Oswald acted alone, although I can accept that he pulled the trigger."

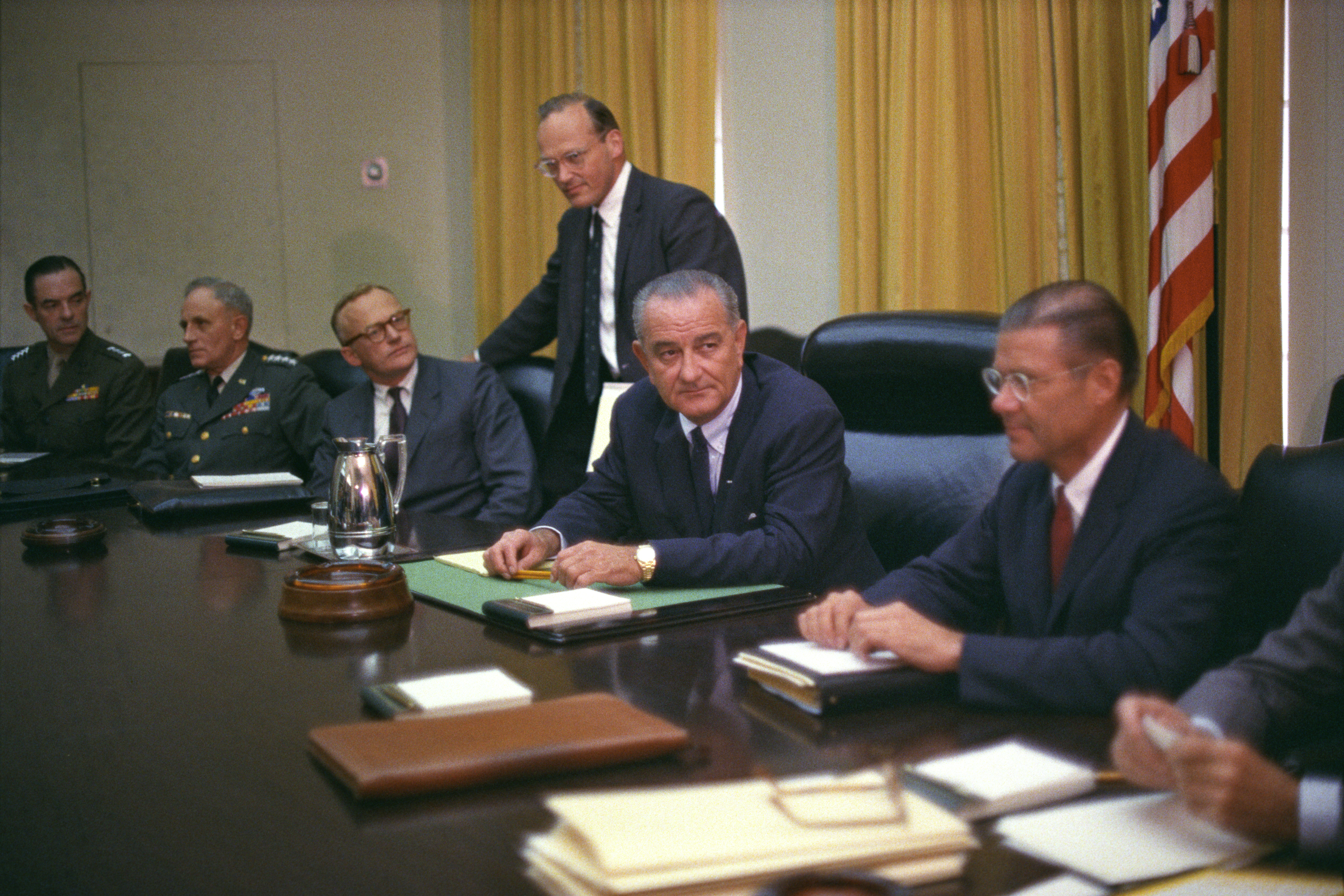
Johnson at a July 1965 Cabinet meeting

When Johnson assumed office, he asked the existing Cabinet to remain in place. Despite his notoriously poor relationship with Johnson, Robert F. Kennedy stayed on as Attorney General until September 1964, when he resigned to run for the U.S. Senate. Four of the Kennedy cabinet members Johnson inherited—Secretary of State Dean Rusk, Secretary of the Interior Stewart Udall, Secretary of Agriculture Orville L. Freeman, and Secretary of Labor W. Willard Wirtz—served until the end of Johnson's presidency. Other Kennedy holdovers, including Secretary of Defense Robert McNamara, left office during Johnson's tenure. Although Johnson had no official chief of staff, Walter Jenkins presided over daily operations at the White House. George Reedy, who was Johnson's second-longest-serving aide, assumed the post of press secretary when John F. Kennedy's own Pierre Salinger left that post in March 1964. Horace Busby served primarily as a speechwriter and political analyst. Bill Moyers handled scheduling and speechwriting part-time.

=== Taxation and budget ===
The new president thought it advantageous to quickly pursue one of Kennedy's primary legislative goals—a tax cut. Johnson worked closely with Senator Harry F. Byrd of Virginia to negotiate a reduction in the budget below $100 billion in exchange for what became overwhelming Senate approval of the Revenue Act of 1964. The act cut individual income tax rates across the board by approximately 20 percent, cut the top marginal tax rate from 91 to 70 percent, and slightly reduced corporate tax rates. Passage of the long-stalled tax cut facilitated efforts to move ahead on civil rights legislation. Despite a period of strong economic growth, heavy spending on the Vietnam War and on domestic programs contributed to a rising budget deficit, as well as a period of inflation that would continue into the 1970s. To counter this, Johnson reluctantly signed a second tax bill, the Revenue and Expenditure Control Act of 1968, which included a mix of tax increases and spending cuts, producing a budget surplus.

=== Civil Rights Act of 1964 ===
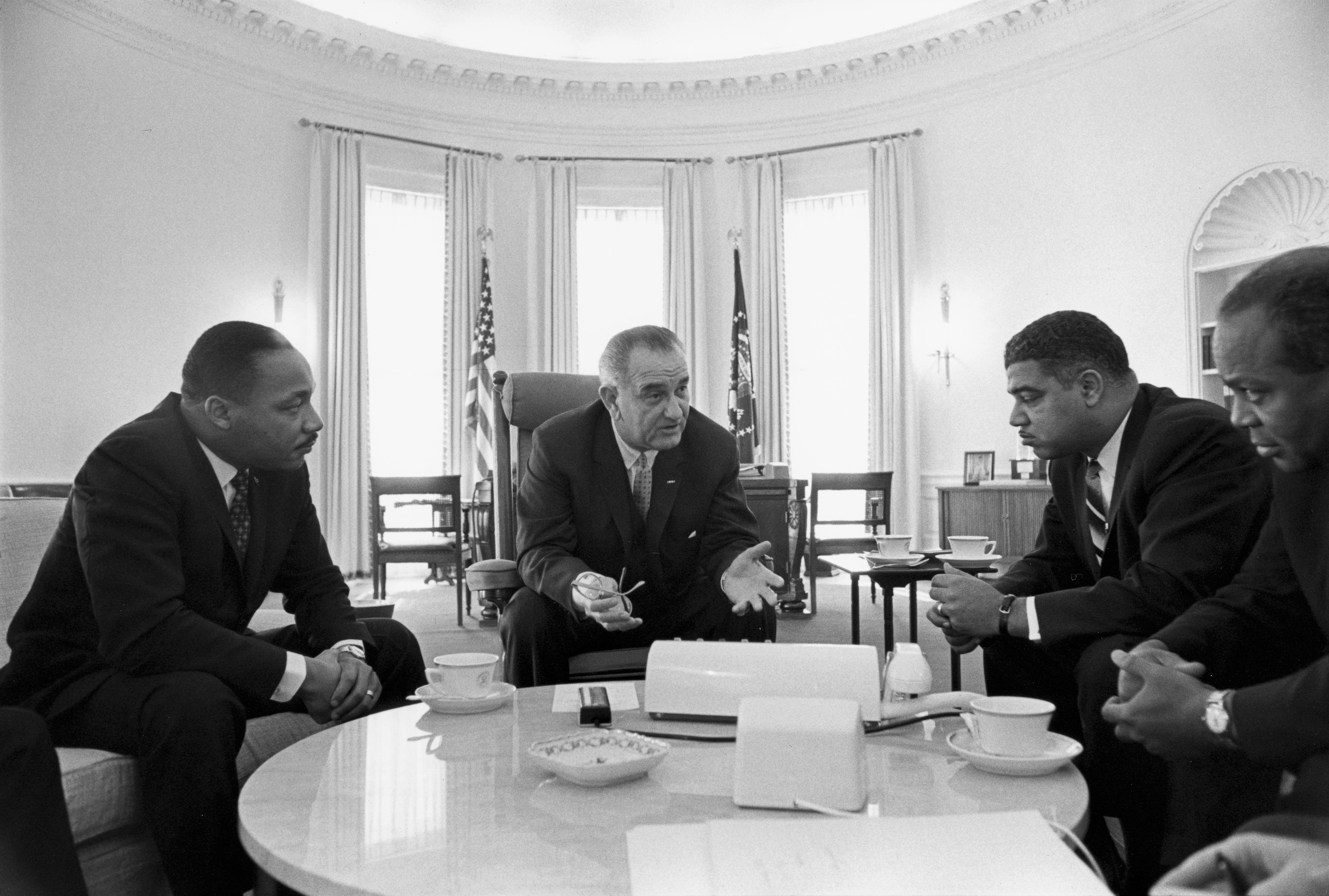
Johnson meeting with civil rights leaders Martin Luther King Jr. (left), Whitney Young, and James Farmer in the Oval Office on January 18, 1964

On November 27, 1963, Johnson delivered his "Let Us Continue" speech to Congress, saying that "No memorial oration or eulogy could more eloquently honor President Kennedy's memory than the earliest possible passage of the Civil Rights Bill for which he fought so long." The wave of national grief following the assassination gave enormous momentum to Johnson's promise to carry out Kennedy's plans.

Johnson asked Robert Kennedy to spearhead the undertaking on Capitol Hill. This provided adequate political cover for Johnson should the effort fail, but if it were successful, Johnson would receive ample credit. Biographer Caro notes that the bill Kennedy had submitted was facing the same tactics that prevented the passage of civil rights bills in the past: Southern congressmen and senators used congressional procedure to prevent it from coming to a vote. In particular, they held up all of the major bills Kennedy had proposed and that were considered urgent, especially the tax reform bill, to force the bill's supporters to pull it. For Johnson's civil rights bill to reach the House floor for a vote, the president needed to find a way to circumvent Representative Howard W. Smith, the chairman of the House Rules Committee. Johnson used a discharge petition to force it onto the House floor. Facing a growing threat that they would be bypassed, the Rules Committee approved the bill and moved it to the floor of the full House, which soon passed it by a vote of 290–110. Johnson convinced Senate Majority Leader Mike Mansfield to put the House bill directly into consideration by the full Senate, bypassing the Senate Judiciary Committee and its segregationist chairman James Eastland. Since bottling up the civil rights bill in a committee was no longer an option, the anti-civil rights senators were left with the filibuster as their only remaining tool. Overcoming the filibuster required the support of at least 20 Republicans, who were growing less supportive because their party was about to nominate for president a candidate who opposed the bill. According to Caro, Johnson ultimately could convince Republican leader Everett Dirksen to support the bill that amassed the necessary Republican votes to overcome the filibuster in March 1964; the bill passed the Senate by a vote of 71–29.

Johnson signed the Civil Rights Act of 1964 into law on July 2. The act outlawed discrimination based on race, color, national origin, religion, or sex. It prohibited racial segregation in public accommodations and employment discrimination, and strengthened the federal government's power to investigate racial and gender employment discrimination. The following evening, Johnson told aide Bill Moyers, "I think we may have lost the South for your lifetime – and mine", anticipating a backlash from Southern whites against Johnson's Democratic Party.

=== Great Society ===
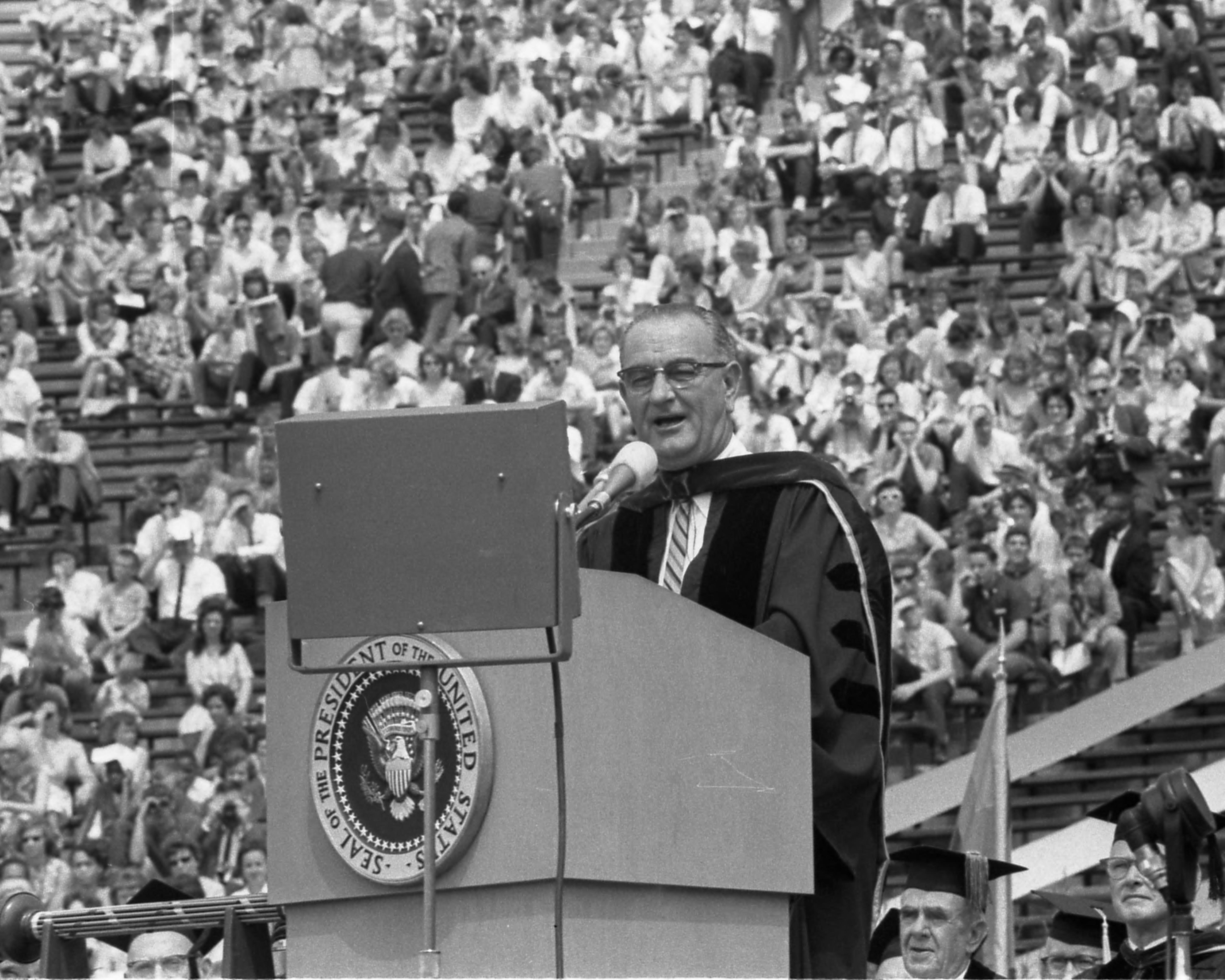
President Johnson formally presented his specific goals for the Great Society during a speech at the University of Michigan, May 1964.

By early 1964, Johnson had begun to use the name "Great Society" to describe his domestic program. Johnson's Great Society program encompassed movements of urban renewal, modern transportation, clean environment, anti-poverty, healthcare reform, crime control, and educational reform. To ensure the passage of his programs, Johnson placed an unprecedented emphasis on relations with Congress.

=== 1964 presidential election ===
In Spring 1964, Johnson was not optimistic about his prospects of being elected president. A pivotal change took place in April when he assumed personal management of negotiations between the railroad brotherhood and the railroad industry over the issue of featherbedding. Johnson emphasized to the parties the potential impact upon the economy of a strike. After considerable horse-trading, especially with the carriers who won promises from the president for greater freedom in setting rights and more liberal depreciation allowances from the Internal Revenue Service, Johnson obtained an agreement. This substantially boosted his self-confidence and image.

Robert F. Kennedy was widely considered an impeccable choice for Johnson's vice presidential running mate but Johnson and Kennedy had never liked each other, and Johnson, afraid that Kennedy would be credited with his election as president, consistently opposed the idea. Kennedy was undecided about accepting an offer as Johnson's running mate, knowing that the prospect rankled Johnson. Barry Goldwater's poor polling numbers was perceived as reducing the political significance of Johnson's selection of a running mate. Hubert Humphrey's selection as vice president then became a foregone conclusion and was thought to strengthen Johnson in the Midwest and industrial Northeast. Knowing the degree of frustration inherent in the office of vice president, Johnson put Humphrey through a gauntlet of interviews to guarantee his loyalty. Having made the decision, he kept the announcement from the press until the last moment to maximize media speculation and coverage.

In preparation for the Democratic convention in Atlantic City, Johnson requested the FBI send 30 agents to cover convention activities; the objective of the squad was to inform the White House staff of any disruptive activities. The squad's focus narrowed upon the Mississippi Freedom Democratic Party (MFDP) delegation, which sought to displace the white segregationist delegation regularly selected in the state. The squad's activities included wiretaps of Martin Luther King's room and the Student Nonviolent Coordinating Committee (SNCC) and the Congress of Racial Equality (CORE). From beginning to end, the squad's assignment was carefully couched in terms of the monitoring of disruptive activities that might endanger the president and other high-ranking officials.

Johnson was very concerned about potential political damage from media coverage of racial tensions exposed by a credentials fight between the MFDP and the segregationist delegation, and he assigned Humphrey to manage the problem. The convention's Credentials Committee declared that two MFDP delegates in the delegation be seated as observers and agreed to "bar future delegations from states where any citizens are deprived of the right to vote because of their race or color". The MFDP rejected the committee's ruling. The convention became the apparent personal triumph that Johnson craved, but a sense of betrayal caused by the marginalization of the MFDP would trigger disaffection with Johnson and the Democratic Party from the left; SNCC chairman John Lewis would call it a "turning point in the civil rights movement".

Results of the 1964 presidential election. Johnson won 486 electoral college votes (61.1% of the popular vote) to Barry Goldwater's 52.

Early in the 1964 presidential campaign, Barry Goldwater appeared to be a strong contender, with strong support from the South, which threatened Johnson's position as he had predicted in reaction to the passage of the Civil Rights Act. However, Goldwater lost momentum as his campaign progressed. On September 7, 1964, Johnson's campaign managers broadcast the "Daisy ad": it portrayed a little girl picking petals from a daisy, followed by a countdown and explosion of a nuclear bomb. The message conveyed was that electing Goldwater risked a nuclear war. Goldwater's campaign message was best symbolized by the bumper sticker displayed by supporters claiming "In your heart, you know he's right". Opponents captured the spirit of Johnson's campaign with bumper stickers that said "In your heart, you know he might" and "In your guts, you know he's nuts". CIA Director William Colby asserted that Tracy Barnes instructed the CIA to spy on the Goldwater campaign and the Republican National Committee to provide information to Johnson's campaign. Johnson won the presidency by a landslide with 61.05 percent of the vote, making it the highest ever share of the popular vote. At the time, this was also the widest popular margin in the 20th century—more than 15.95 million votes—this was later surpassed by incumbent President Nixon's victory in 1972. In the Electoral College, Johnson defeated Goldwater by a margin of 486 to 52. Johnson won 44 states, compared to Goldwater's six. Voters also gave Johnson the largest majorities in Congress since FDR's election in 1936—a Senate with a 68–32 majority and a House with a 295–140 Democratic margin.

=== Voting Rights Act ===
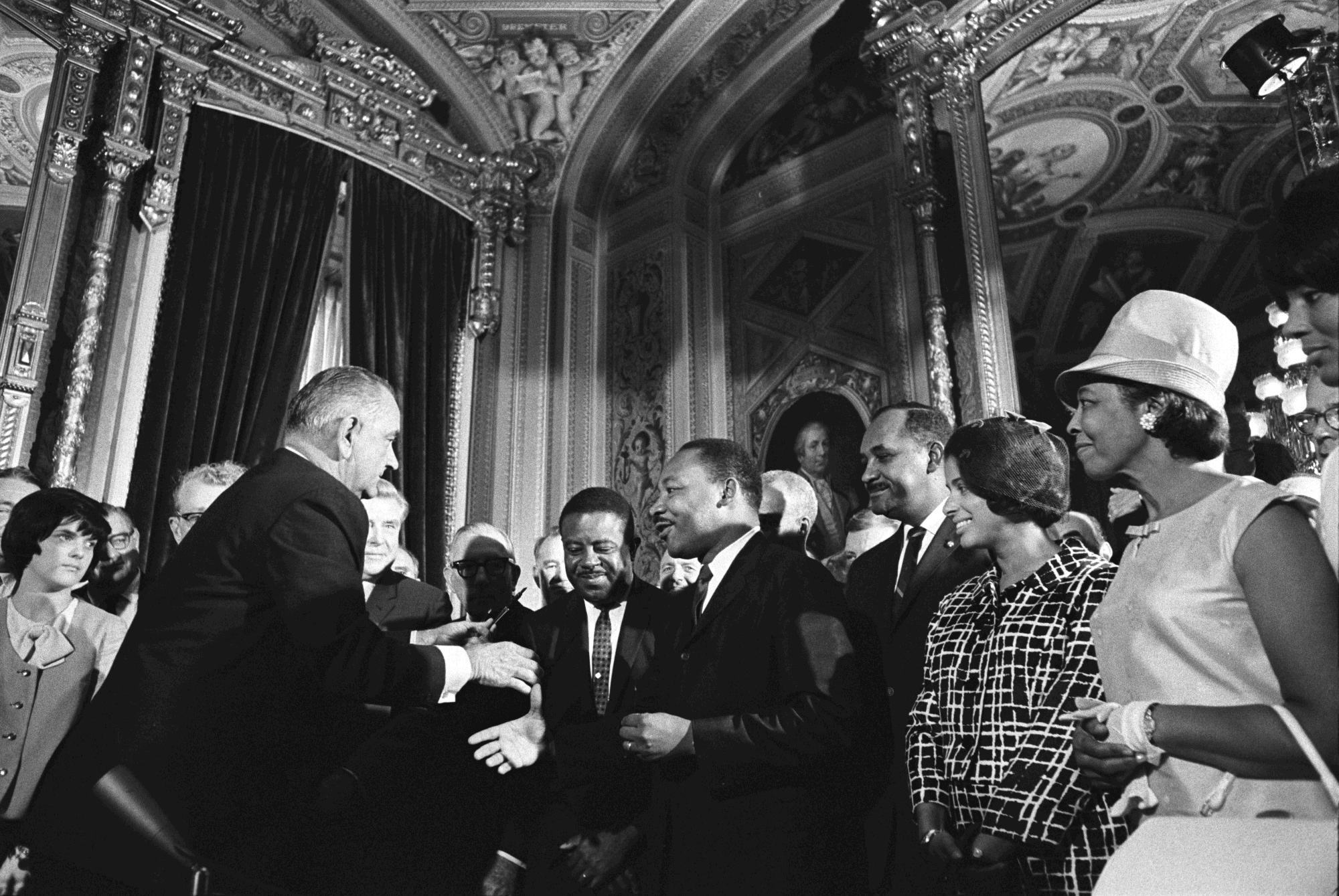
President Lyndon B. Johnson, Martin Luther King Jr., and Rosa Parks at the signing of the Voting Rights Act on August 6, 1965

Soon after the 1964 election, civil rights organizations such as the Southern Christian Leadership Conference (SCLC) and the Student Nonviolent Coordinating Committee (SNCC) began a push for federal action to protect the voting rights of racial minorities. On March 7, 1965, SCLC began the Selma to Montgomery marches in which Selma residents, on their third attempt on March 21, proceeded to march to Alabama's capital, Montgomery, to highlight voting rights issues and present Governor George Wallace with their grievances. On the first march, demonstrators were stopped by state and county police, who shot tear gas into the crowd and beat and trampled protesters. Televised footage of the scene, which became known as "Bloody Sunday", generated outrage across the country. In response to the rapidly increasing political pressure upon him, Johnson decided to immediately send voting rights legislation to Congress, and to address the American people in a speech before a Joint session of Congress. He began:

I speak tonight for the dignity of man and the destiny of democracy. I urge every member of both parties, Americans of all religions and of all colors, from every section of this country, to join me in that cause. ... Rarely in any time does an issue lay bare the secret heart of America itself. Rarely are we met with a challenge, not to our growth or abundance, or our welfare or our security, but rather to the values and the purposes and the meaning of our beloved nation. The issue of equal rights for American Negroes is such an issue. And should we defeat every enemy, and should we double our wealth and conquer the stars, and still be unequal to this issue, then we will have failed as a people and as a nation. For, with a country as with a person, 'what is a man profited if he shall gain the whole world, and lose his own soul?'

Johnson and Dirksen established a strong bipartisan alliance in favor of the Voting Rights Act of 1965, precluding the possibility of a Senate filibuster defeating the bill. In August 1965, the House approved the bill by a vote of 333 to 85, and Senate passed the bill by a vote of 79 to 18. The landmark legislation outlawed discrimination in voting, thus allowing millions of Southern blacks to vote for the first time. The results were significant; between the years of 1968 and 1980, the number of Southern black elected state and federal officeholders nearly doubled. In Mississippi, the voter registration rate of African Americans rose from 6.7 percent to 59.8 percent between 1964 and 1967, a reflection of a broader increase in African-American voter registration rates.

After the murder of civil rights worker Viola Liuzzo, Johnson went on television to announce the arrest of four Ku Klux Klans men implicated in her death. He angrily denounced the Klan as a "hooded society of bigots", and warned them to "return to a decent society before it's too late". Johnson was the first president to arrest and prosecute members of the Klan since Ulysses S. Grant. (Note: President Grant, on October 17, 1871, suspended habeas corpus in nine South Carolina counties, sent in troops, and prosecuted the Klan in the federal district court.) He turned to themes of Christian redemption to push for civil rights, mobilizing support from churches. At the Howard University commencement address on June 4, 1965, he said that both the government and the nation needed to help achieve these goals: "To shatter forever not only the barriers of law and public practice but the walls which bound the condition of many by the color of his skin. To dissolve, as best we can, the antique enmities of the heart which diminish the holder, divide the great democracy, and do wrong—great wrong ‍—‌ to the children of God ..."

=== Fair Housing Act ===
The Fair Housing Act, a component of the Civil Rights Act of 1968, outlawed several forms of housing discrimination and effectively allowed many African Americans to move to the suburbs. Johnson submitted a bill to Congress in April 1966 that barred house owners from refusing to enter into agreements on the basis of race; the bill immediately garnered opposition from many of the Northerners who had supported the last two major civil rights bills. Though a version of the bill passed the House, it failed to win Senate approval, marking Johnson's first major legislative defeat. The law gained new impetus after the April 4, 1968, assassination of Martin Luther King Jr., and the civil unrest across the country that followed. The bill passed Congress on April 10 and was quickly signed into law by Johnson.

=== War on Poverty ===
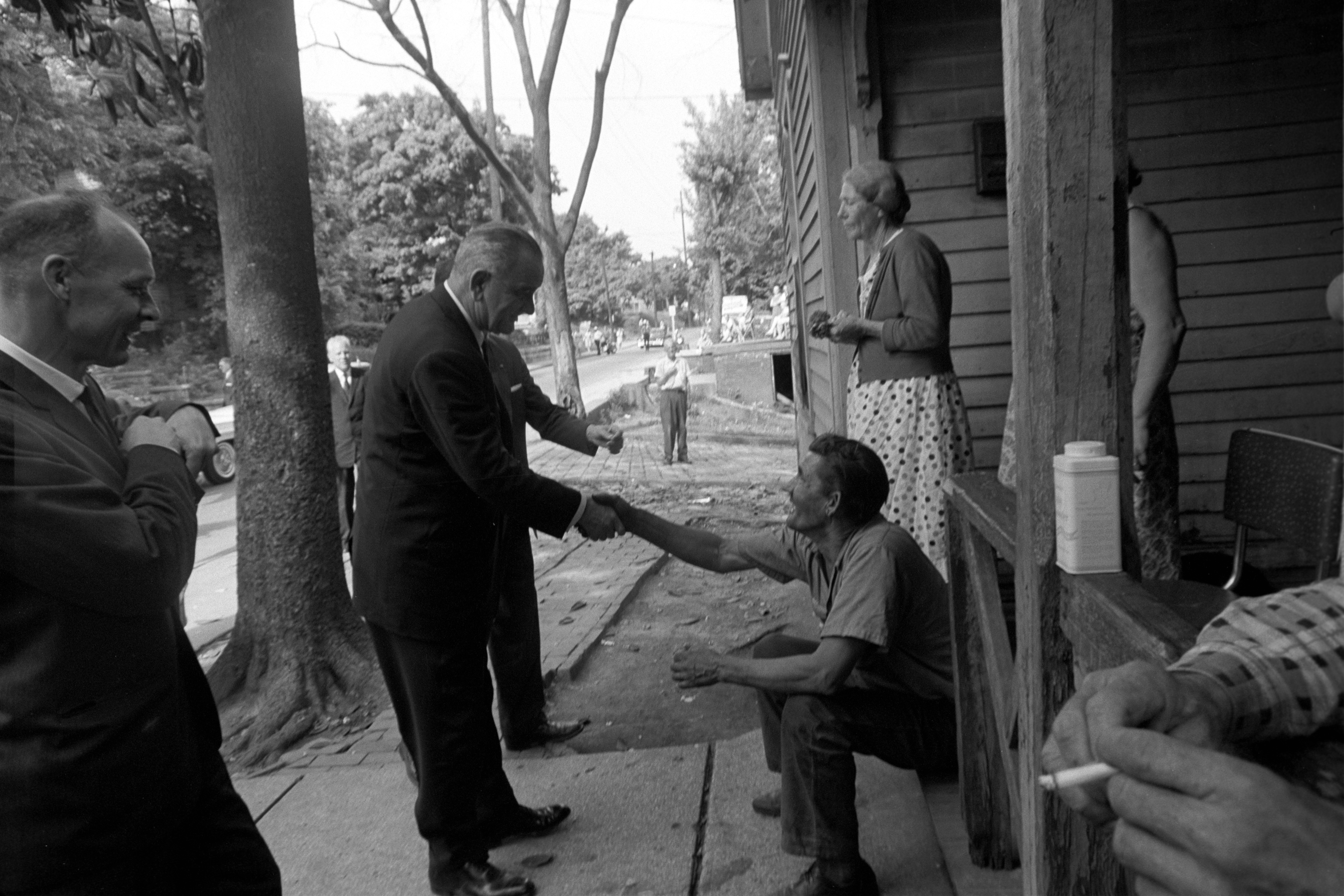
President Johnson's poverty tour in 1964

In his 1964 State of the Union Address Johnson stated, "this administration today, here and now, declares an unconditional war on poverty in America. Our aim is not only to relieve the symptoms of poverty but to cure it–and above all, to prevent it." During the Johnson administration, national poverty declined significantly, with the percentage of Americans living below the poverty line dropping from 23 to 12 percent.

In August 1964, Johnson signed the Economic Opportunity Act of 1964, which would create the Office of Economic Opportunity (OEO) to oversee local Community Action Agencies (CAA) charged with dispensing aid to those in poverty. Each CAA was required to have "maximum feasible participation" from local residents, who would design and operate anti-poverty programs unique to their communities' needs. This was threatening to local political leaders who saw CAAs as alternative power structures in their own communities, funded and encouraged by the OEO. In 1967, the Green Amendment gave city governments the right to decide which entity would be the official CAA for their community. The net result was a halt to the citizen participation reform movement.

The Economic Opportunity Act created the Job Corps and Volunteers in Service to America (VISTA), a domestic version of the Peace Corps. Modeled after the Civilian Conservation Corps (CCC), Job Corps was a residential education and job-training program that provided academic and vocational skills to low-income at-risk young people. VISTA deployed volunteers on community projects across the nation to address issues such as illiteracy, inadequate housing, and poor health. By the end of 1965, 2,000 volunteers had signed on. Congress also agreed to Upward Bound, a program that trained low-income students in the skills they needed for college. The act reflected Johnson's belief that the government could best help the impoverished by providing them with economic opportunities. Johnson convinced Congress to approve the Food Stamp Act of 1964, which made permanent the food stamp pilot programs that had been initiated by President Kennedy.

To combat homelessness, Johnson signed the Housing and Urban Development Act of 1965, which provided rent subsidies for the elderly and disabled, construction of 240,000 housing units, and $3 billion for urban renewal. In September 1965, Johnson would go on to sign legislation that would establish the Department of Housing and Urban Development (HUD), to oversee the newly funded housing programs. Providing an additional $1.1 billion for roads, health clinics, and other public works was the Appalachian Regional Development Act, a measure to improve living standards in Appalachia.

Johnson took an additional step in the War on Poverty with an urban renewal effort, the "Demonstration Cities Program". To be eligible, a city was required to demonstrate its readiness to "arrest blight and decay and make a substantial impact on the development of its entire city". Johnson requested an investment of $400 million per year totaling $2.4 billion. In late 1966, Congress passed a substantially reduced program costing $900 million, which Johnson later called the Model Cities Program. The New York Times wrote 22 years later that the program was largely a failure.

=== Healthcare reform ===
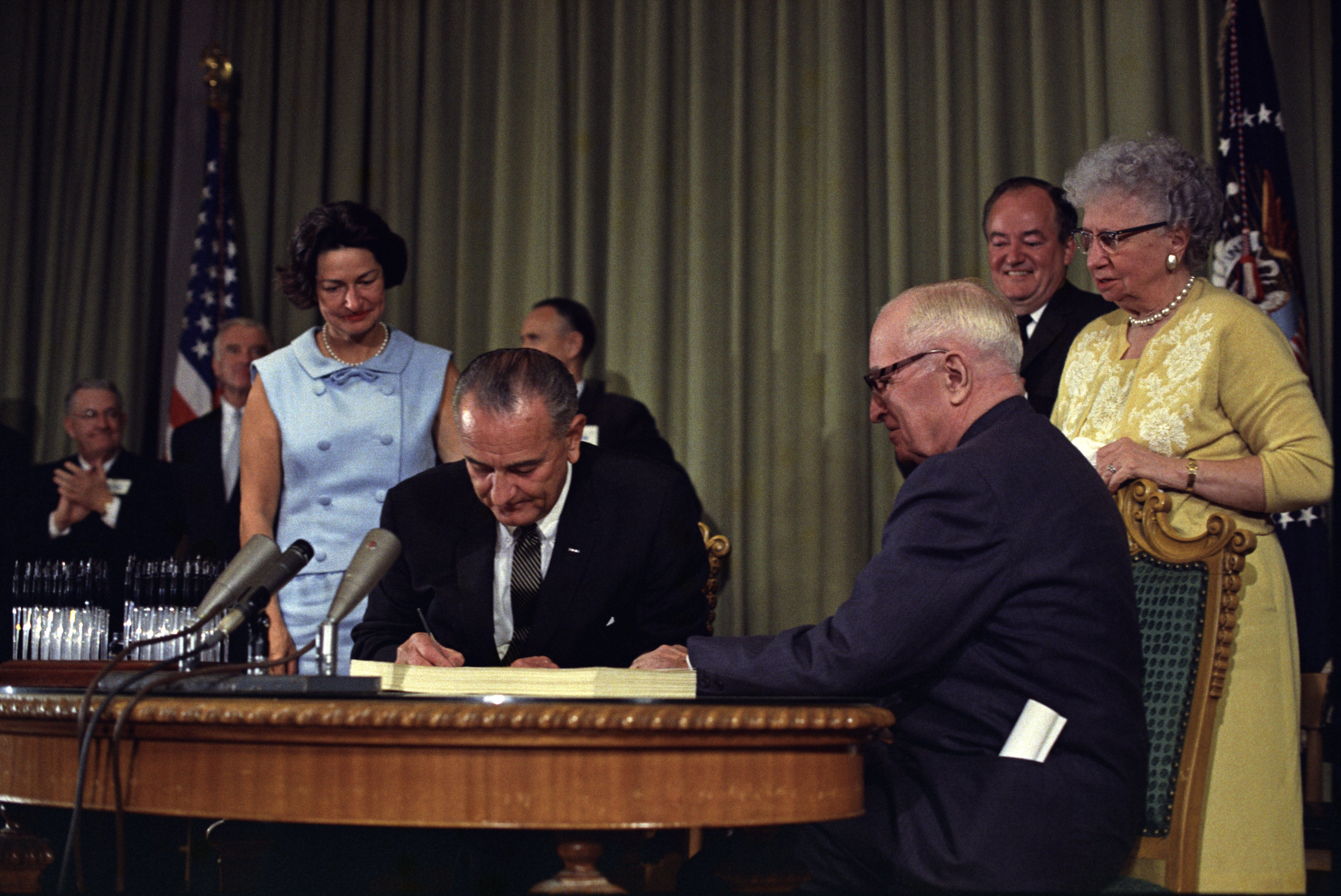
Former president Truman and wife Bess at Johnson's signing of the Medicare Bill in 1965, as Lady Bird and Hubert Humphrey look on

Johnson's initial effort to improve healthcare was the creation of The Commission on Heart Disease, Cancer, and Strokes (HDCS). These diseases accounted for 71 percent of the nation's deaths in 1962.

In 1965, Johnson turned his focus to hospital insurance for the aged under Social Security. The key player in initiating this program, named Medicare, was Representative Wilbur Mills, Chairman of the House Ways and Means Committee. To reduce Republican opposition, Mills suggested that Medicare be fashioned as three layers: hospital insurance under Social Security; a voluntary insurance program for doctor visits; and an expanded medical welfare program for the poor administered through the states, known as Medicaid. The bill passed the House by a margin of 110 votes on April 8. The effort in the Senate was considerably more complicated, but the Medicare bill passed Congress on July 28. Medicare now covers tens of millions of Americans.

=== Immigration ===
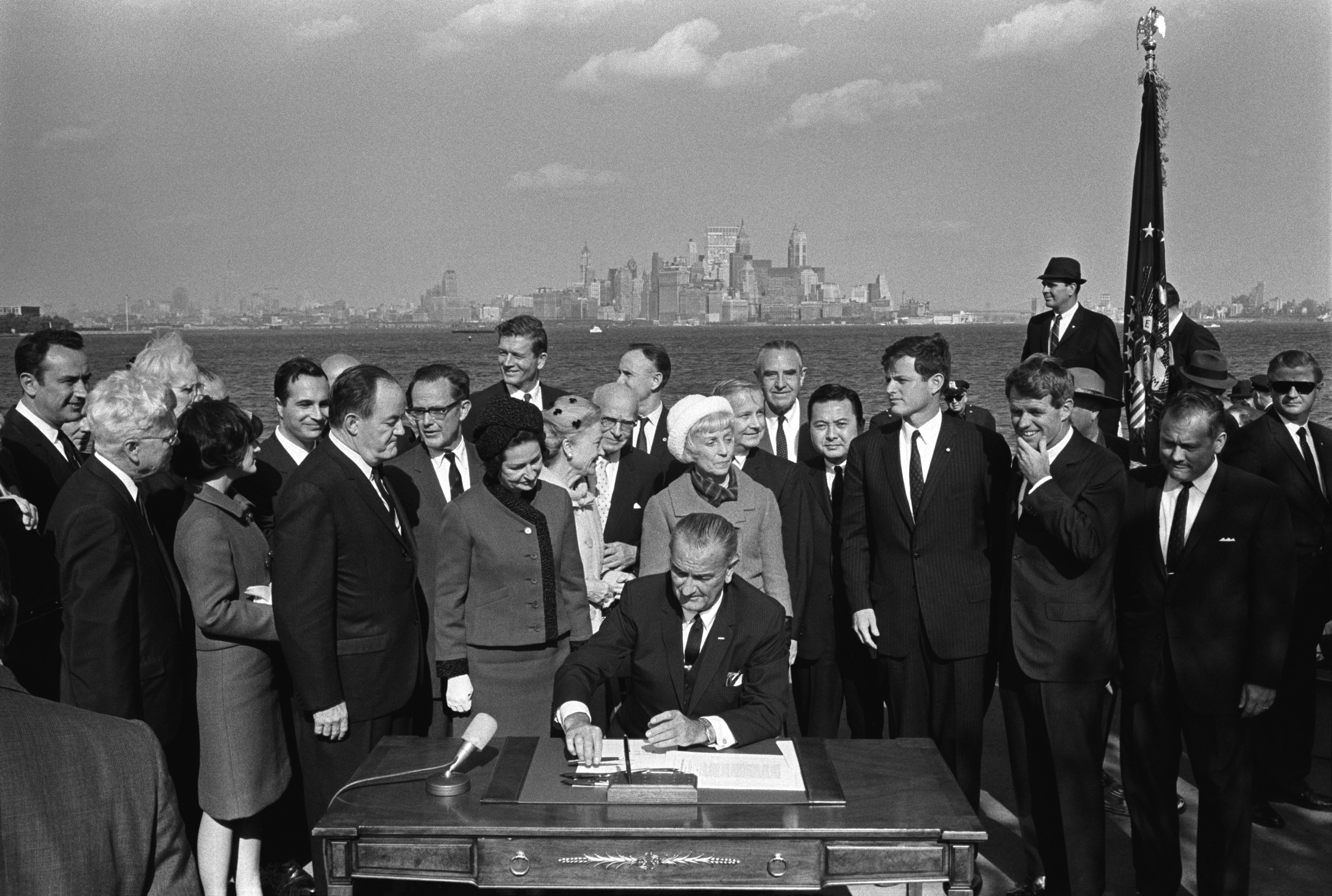
President Johnson signs the Immigration and Nationality Act of 1965 as U.S. Senators Edward Kennedy and Robert F. Kennedy, and others look on.

The sweeping Immigration and Nationality Act of 1965 reformed the country's immigration system and repealed the National Origins Formula, which had restricted emigration from countries outside of Western Europe and the Western Hemisphere. The annual rate of inflow doubled between 1965 and 1970, and doubled again by 1990, with dramatic increases from Asia and Latin America, including Mexico. Scholars give Johnson little credit for the law, which was not one of his priorities; he had supported the McCarren–Walter Act of 1952, which proved unpopular with reformers.

=== Federal funding for education ===
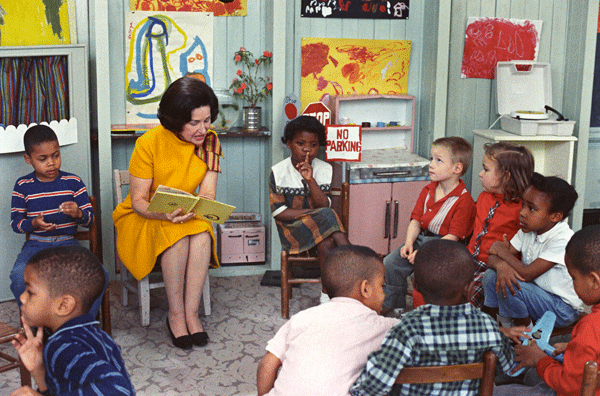
First Lady Lady Bird Johnson visits a Head Start class, 1966.

Johnson, whose own ticket out of poverty was a public education in Texas, believed that education was an essential component of the American dream, especially for minorities. He made education the top priority of the Great Society agenda, with an emphasis on helping poor children. Buoyed by his landslide victory in the 1964 election, in early 1965 Johnson proposed the Elementary and Secondary Education Act (ESEA), which would double federal spending on education from $4 billion to $8 billion. The bill quickly passed both houses of Congress by wide margins. ESEA increased funding to all school districts, but directed more money going to districts that had large proportions of students from poor families.

Although ESEA solidified Johnson's support among K–12 teachers' unions, neither the Higher Education Act nor the new endowments mollified the college professors and students growing increasingly uneasy with the war in Vietnam. Johnson's second major education program was the Higher Education Act of 1965, which increased federal money given to universities, created scholarships, gave low-interest loans to students, and established a Teacher Corps. Johnson also established Head Start, an early education program to help prepare children from disadvantaged families for success in public schools. In 1967, Johnson signed the Public Broadcasting Act to create educational television programs to supplement broadcast networks.

In 1965, Johnson set up the National Endowment for the Humanities and the National Endowment for the Arts, to support the study of literature, history, and law, and arts such as music, painting, and sculpture.

=== Transportation ===
In March 1966, Johnson sent to Congress a transportation message which included the creation of a new Transportation Department, comprising the Commerce Department's Office of Transportation, the Bureau of Public Roads, the Federal Aviation Agency, the Coast Guard, the Maritime Administration, the Civil Aeronautics Board, and the Interstate Commerce Commission. The bill passed the Senate after some negotiation over navigation projects; in the House, passage required negotiation over maritime interests and the bill was signed October 15, 1965.

=== Environment ===
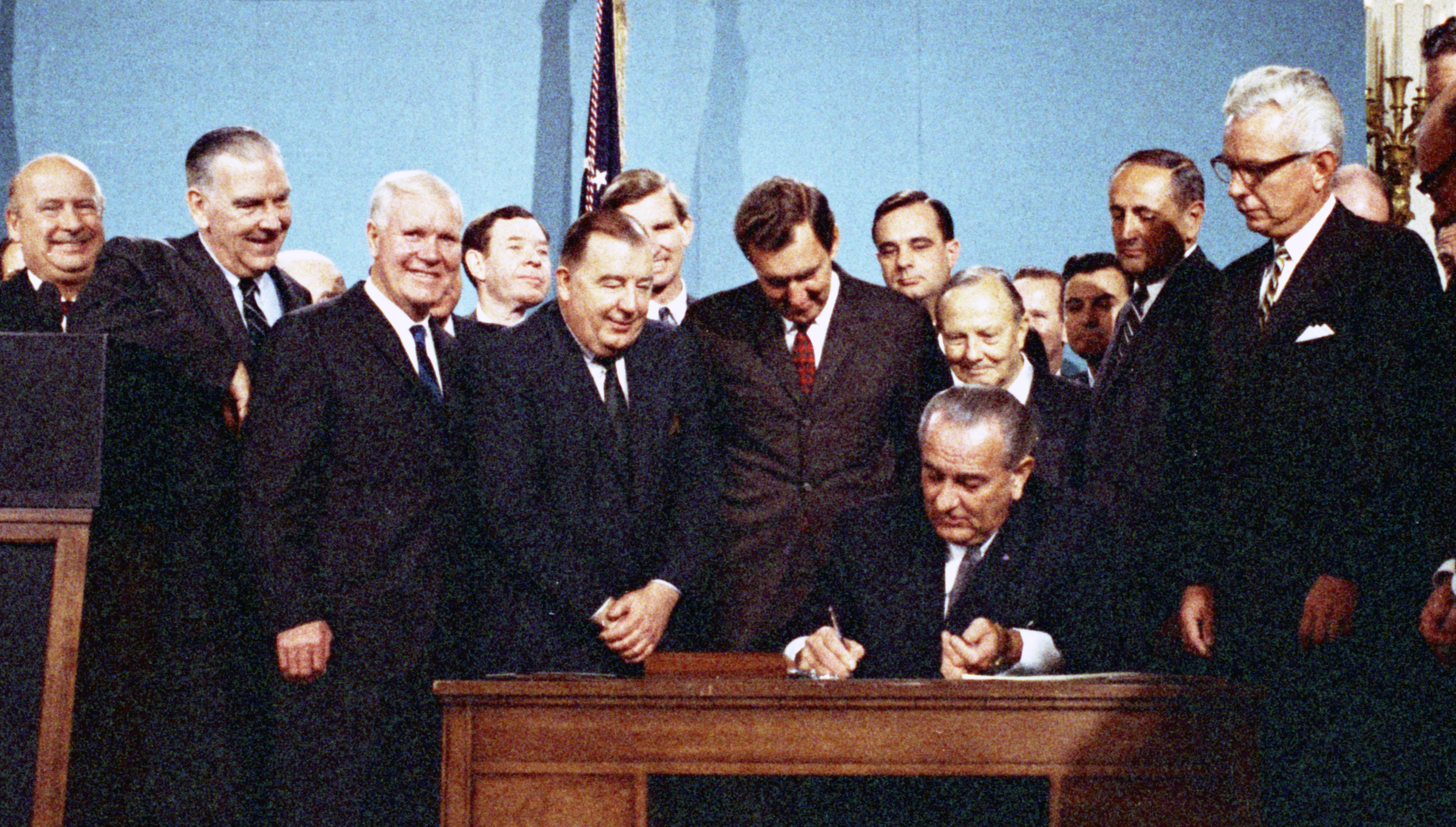
Johnson signing the Clean Air Act

During his tenure as president, Johnson signed over 300 conservation measures into law, forming the legal basis of the modern environmental movement. He signed into law the Clean Air Act of 1963, which had been proposed by President Kennedy. The Clean Air Act set emission standards for stationary emitters of air pollutants and directed federal funding to air quality research. In 1965, the act was amended by the Motor Vehicle Air Pollution Control Act, which directed the federal government to establish and enforce national standards for controlling the emission of pollutants from new motor vehicles and engines. In September 1964, Johnson signed the Wilderness Act, which established the National Wilderness Preservation System (preserving 9.1 million acres of forestland from industrial development), and signed a law establishing the Land and Water Conservation Fund, which aids the purchase of land used for federal and state parks.

In 1965, First Lady Lady Bird Johnson took the lead in calling for passage of the Highway Beautification Act. The act called for control of outdoor advertising, including removal of certain types of signs, along the nation's growing Interstate Highway System and the existing federal-aid primary highway system. It also required certain junkyards along Interstate or primary highways to be removed or screened and encouraged scenic enhancement and roadside development.

=== Gun control ===
Though Johnson had already introduced a gun control bill on June 6, 1968, after the assassination of Robert Kennedy, Lady Bird Johnson's press secretary Liz Carpenter, in a memo to the president, worried that the country had been "brainwashed by high drama", and that Johnson "need[ed] some quick dramatic actions" that addressed "the issue of violence." In October, Johnson signed the Gun Control Act of 1968, but did not invoke the memory of Robert Kennedy as he had so often done with his brother—an omission historian Jeff Shesol has argued was motivated by Johnson's longstanding contempt for Robert. The measure prohibited convicted felons, drug users, and the mentally ill from purchasing handguns and raised record-keeping and licensing requirements. It also banned mail order sales of rifles and shotguns.

=== Urban riots ===
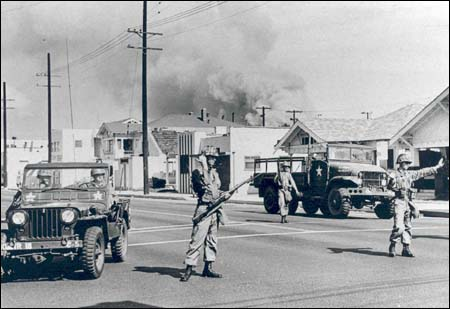
Soldiers direct traffic away from an area of South Central Los Angeles burning during the 1965 Watts riots.

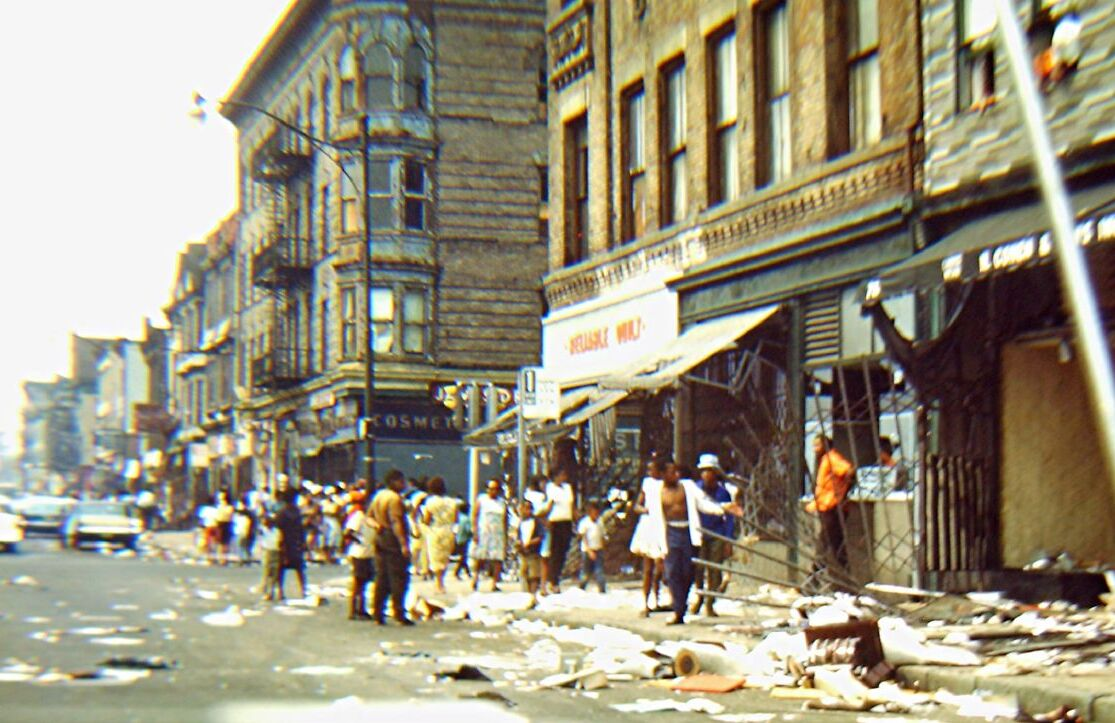
1967 Newark riots

The nation experienced a series of "long hot summers" of civil unrest during the Johnson years. They started with the Harlem riots in 1964, and the Watts district of Los Angeles in 1965. The momentum for the advancement of civil rights came to a sudden halt following the riots in Watts. After 34 people were killed and $35 million (equivalent to $357.58 million in 2025) in property was damaged, the public feared an expansion of the violence to other cities, and so the appetite for additional programs in Johnson's agenda was lost.

During the "Long hot summer of 1967", over 150 instances of civil unrest and urban riots erupted across the United States, constituting a peak in a broader wave of rebellions. The Boston Globe called it "a revolution of black Americans against white Americans, a violent petition for the redress of long-standing grievances." The Newark riots left 26 dead and 1,500 injured. The Detroit riot resulted in 43 deaths, 2250 injuries, 4,000 arrests, and millions of dollars' worth of property damage. Governor George Romney sent in 7,400 national guard troops to quell fire bombings, looting, and attacks on businesses and police. Johnson finally sent in federal troops with tanks and machine guns. At an August 2, 1967, cabinet meeting, Attorney General Ramsey Clark warned that untrained and undisciplined local police forces and National Guardsmen might trigger a "guerrilla war in the streets", as evidenced by the climate of sniper fire in Newark and Detroit. Snipers created a dangerous situation for both law enforcement and civilians, with shooters often targeting from rooftops and other concealed locations.

Johnson's popularity plummeted as a massive white political backlash took shape, reinforcing the sense Johnson had lost control of the streets of major cities and his own party. The president created the 11-member Kerner Commission to study the causes behind the recurring outbreaks of urban civil disorder, headed by Illinois Governor Otto Kerner. The commission's 1968 report suggested legislative measures to promote racial integration and alleviate poverty and concluded that the nation was "moving toward two societies, one black, one white—separate and unequal." According to Press Secretary George Christian, Johnson was unsurprised by the riots, saying: "What did you expect? ... When you put your foot on a man's neck and hold him down for three hundred years, and then you let him up, what's he going to do? He's going to knock your block off."

=== Backlash against Johnson (1966–1967) ===
In 1966, the press sensed a credibility gap between what Johnson was saying in press conferences and what was happening in the Vietnam War, which led to less favorable coverage of Johnson and his administration.

By the end of 1966, Democratic Governor Warren E. Hearnes of Missouri warned that Johnson would lose the state by 100,000 votes, despite winning by a margin of 500,000 in 1964. "Frustration over Vietnam; too much federal spending and ... taxation; no great public support for your Great Society programs; and ... public disenchantment with the civil rights programs "had eroded the President's standing, the governor reported. There were bright spots; in January 1967, Johnson boasted that wages were the highest in history, unemployment was at a 13-year low, and corporate profits and farm incomes were greater than ever; a 4.5 percent jump in consumer prices was worrisome, as was the rise in interest rates. Johnson asked for a temporary 6 percent surcharge in income taxes to cover the mounting deficit caused by increased spending. Johnson's approval ratings stayed below 50 percent and, in December 1966, his disapproval rating surpassed his approval rating. In January 1967, the number of his strong supporters had plunged to 16 percent, from 25 percent four months before.

Asked to explain his diminished popularity, Johnson said, "I am a dominating personality, and when I get things done I don't always please all the people." Johnson also blamed the press, saying they showed "complete irresponsibility and lie and misstate facts and have no one to be answerable to", and "the preachers, liberals and professors" who had turned against him.

In the congressional elections of 1966, the Republicans gained three seats in the Senate and 47 in the House, reinvigorating the conservative coalition, which made it more difficult for Johnson to pass additional Great Society legislation. However, Congress ultimately passed almost 96 percent of the administration's Great Society programs.

=== Space program ===
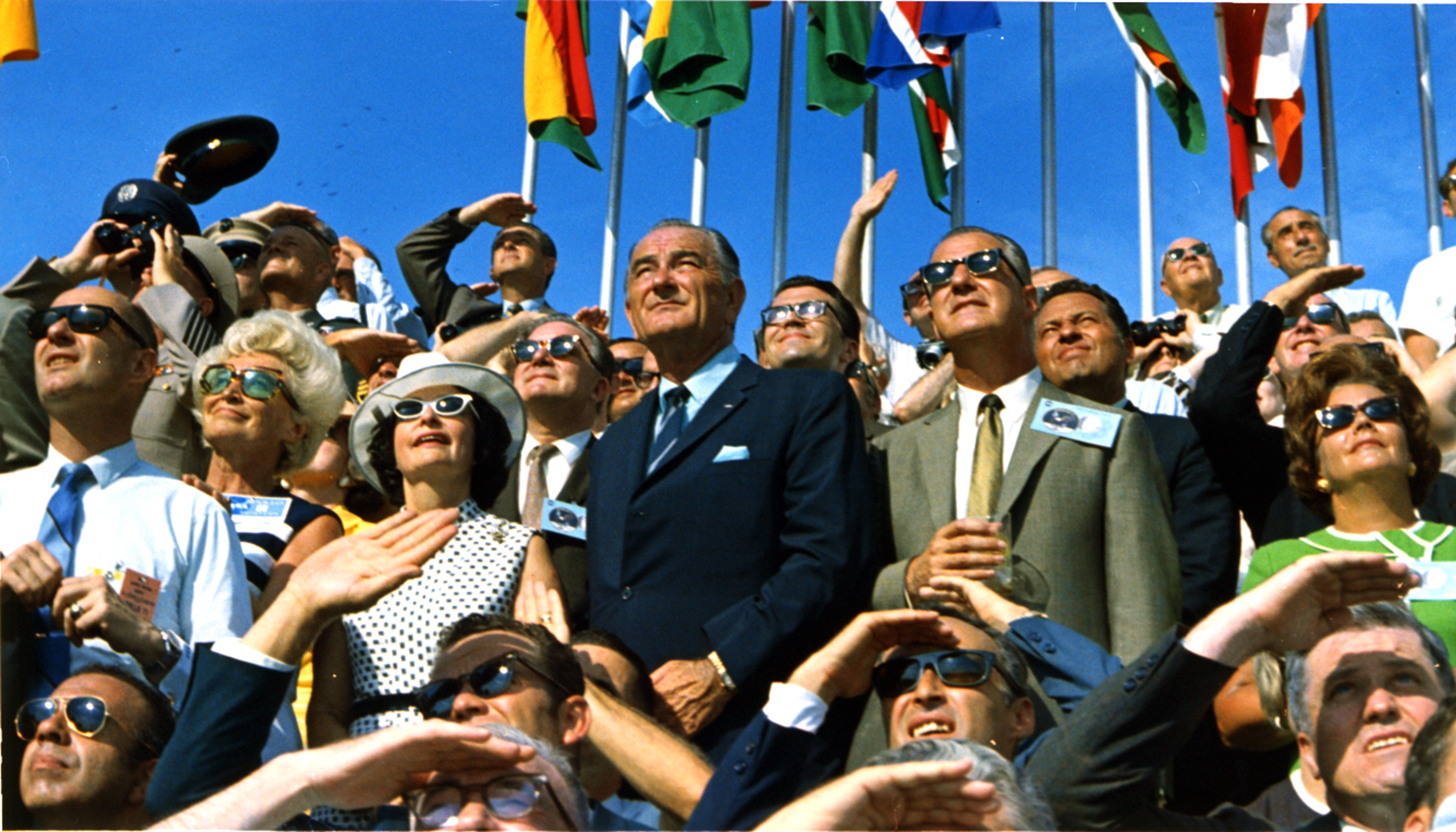
Former President Johnson (center left) and Vice President Spiro Agnew (center right) witness the liftoff of Apollo 11, the first crewed spacecraft to land on the Moon, on July 16, 1969

During the Johnson administration, NASA conducted the Gemini crewed space program, developed the Saturn V rocket and its launch facility, and prepared to make the first crewed Apollo program flights. On January 27, 1967, the nation was stunned when the entire crew of Apollo 1 was killed in a cabin fire during a spacecraft test on the launch pad, stopping Apollo in its tracks. Rather than appointing another Warren-style commission, Johnson accepted Administrator James E. Webb's request for NASA to do its own investigation.

Johnson maintained his staunch support of Apollo through Congressional and press controversy, and the program recovered. The first two crewed missions, Apollo 7 and the first crewed flight to the Moon, Apollo 8, were completed by the end of Johnson's term. He congratulated the Apollo 8 crew, saying, "You've taken ... all of us, all over the world, into a new era." On July 16, 1969, Johnson attended the launch of the first Moon landing mission Apollo 11, becoming the first former or incumbent U.S. president to witness a rocket launch.

=== Vietnam War ===
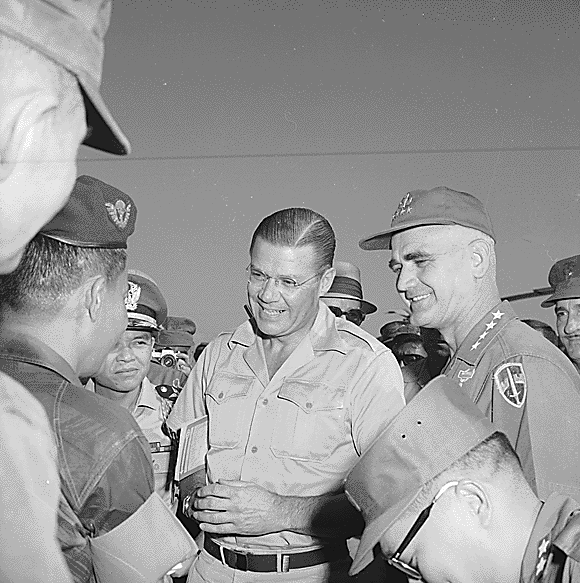
Secretary of Defense Robert McNamara and General Westmoreland in Da Nang in August 1965

The Vietnam War began in 1955 as Communist forces started operating in South Vietnam. By the time Johnson took office, there were 16,700 American military personnel in South Vietnam. Despite some misgivings, Johnson ultimately came to support escalation of the U.S. role in Vietnam. Like the vast majority of American leaders in the mid-1960s, he was determined to prevent the spread of Communism. Johnson's decision to escalate was also influenced heavily by reputation. Under pressure from pro-war politicians like Barry Goldwater, Johnson feared that if he made the decision to not stand firm in Vietnam he would lose domestic political credibility as well as contribute to a decline in the international reputation of the U.S. On October 11, 1963, President Kennedy had signed NSAM 263 ordering the withdrawal of 1,000 military personnel by the end of the year following recommendations of the McNamara–Taylor mission report. On November 26, Johnson signed NSAM 273 which reaffirmed the Kennedy administration withdrawal approval and continued support for South Vietnam. In August 1964, ambiguous evidence suggested two U.S. destroyers had been attacked by North Vietnamese torpedo boats in international waters in the Gulf of Tonkin. Although Johnson very much wanted to keep discussions about Vietnam out of the 1964 election campaign, he felt forced to respond to the supposed Communist aggression. He obtained from Congress the Gulf of Tonkin Resolution on August 7, 1964, giving blanket congressional approval for use of military force to repel future attacks.

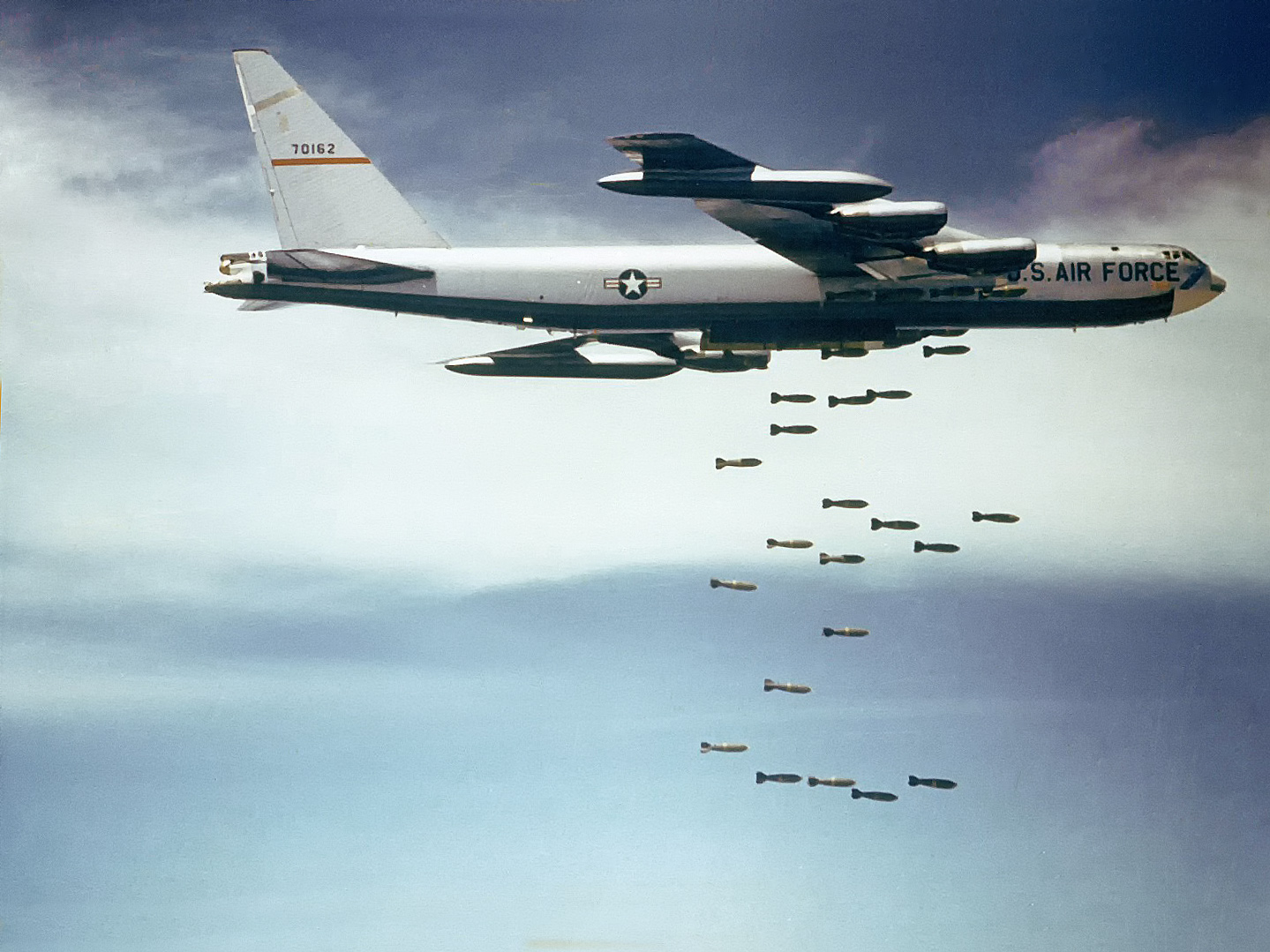
Tens of thousands of Vietnamese civilians were killed during the bombing of North Vietnam in Operation Rolling Thunder.

Johnson decided on a systematic bombing campaign, which became known as Operation Rolling Thunder, in February 1965 after an attack by Viet Cong guerrillas on Pleiku Air Base, killing eight Americans. The U.S. would continue to bomb North Vietnam until late 1968. In March 1965, McGeorge Bundy called for American ground operations; Johnson agreed and also quietly changed the mission from defensive to offensive operations. On March 8, 1965, 3,500 troops went ashore near Da Nang, the first time U.S. combat forces had been sent to mainland Asia since the Korean War. In June, South Vietnamese Ambassador Maxwell D. Taylor reported that the bombing offensive against North Vietnam had been ineffective and that the South Vietnamese army was outclassed and in danger of collapse. In late July, McNamara and Johnson's top advisors recommended an increase in U.S. soldiers from 75,000 to over 200,000. Johnson agreed but felt boxed in by unpalatable choices. If he sent additional troops he would be attacked as an interventionist, and if he did not, he thought he risked being impeached. By October 1965, there were over 200,000 troops deployed in Vietnam. Throughout 1965, few members of Congress or the administration openly criticized Johnson's handling of the war.

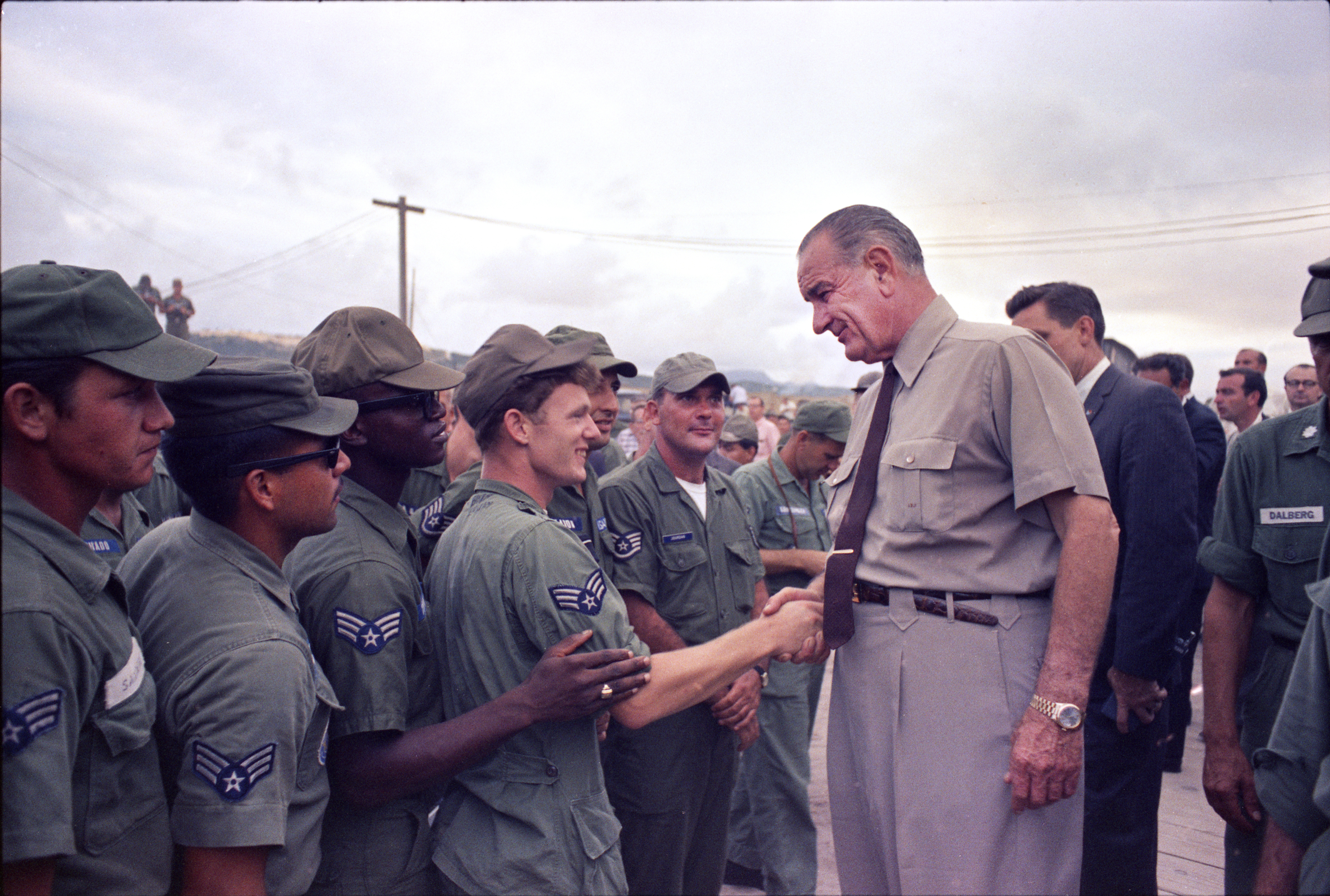
President Johnson shakes hands with U.S. airmen at Cam Ranh Bay in South Vietnam, c. October 1966.

In early 1966, Senator Robert F. Kennedy harshly criticized Johnson's bombing campaign, stating that the U.S. may be headed "on a road from which there is no turning back, a road that leads to catastrophe for all mankind." Soon thereafter, the Senate Foreign Relations Committee, chaired by Senator James William Fulbright, held televised hearings examining the administration's Vietnam policy. In July, polling results indicated that Americans favored the bombing campaign by a five-to-one margin; however, in August a Defense Department study indicated that the bombing campaign was having minimal impact on North Vietnam. By late 1966, multiple sources began to report progress was being made against the North Vietnamese logistics and infrastructure; Johnson was urged to begin peace discussions. English philosopher Bertrand Russell initiated the International War Crimes Tribunal to condemn the American effort. The gap with Hanoi, however, was an unbridgeable demand on both sides for a unilateral end to bombing and withdrawal of forces. Johnson grew more and more anxious about justifying war casualties, and talked of the need for decisive victory, despite the unpopularity of the cause. By the end of 1966, it was clear that the air campaign and the pacification effort had both failed, and Johnson agreed to McNamara's new recommendation to add 70,000 troops in 1967 and the CIA's recommendations to increased bombings against North Vietnam. The bombing escalation ended secret talks being held with North Vietnam, but U.S. leaders did not consider North Vietnamese intentions in those talks to be genuine.

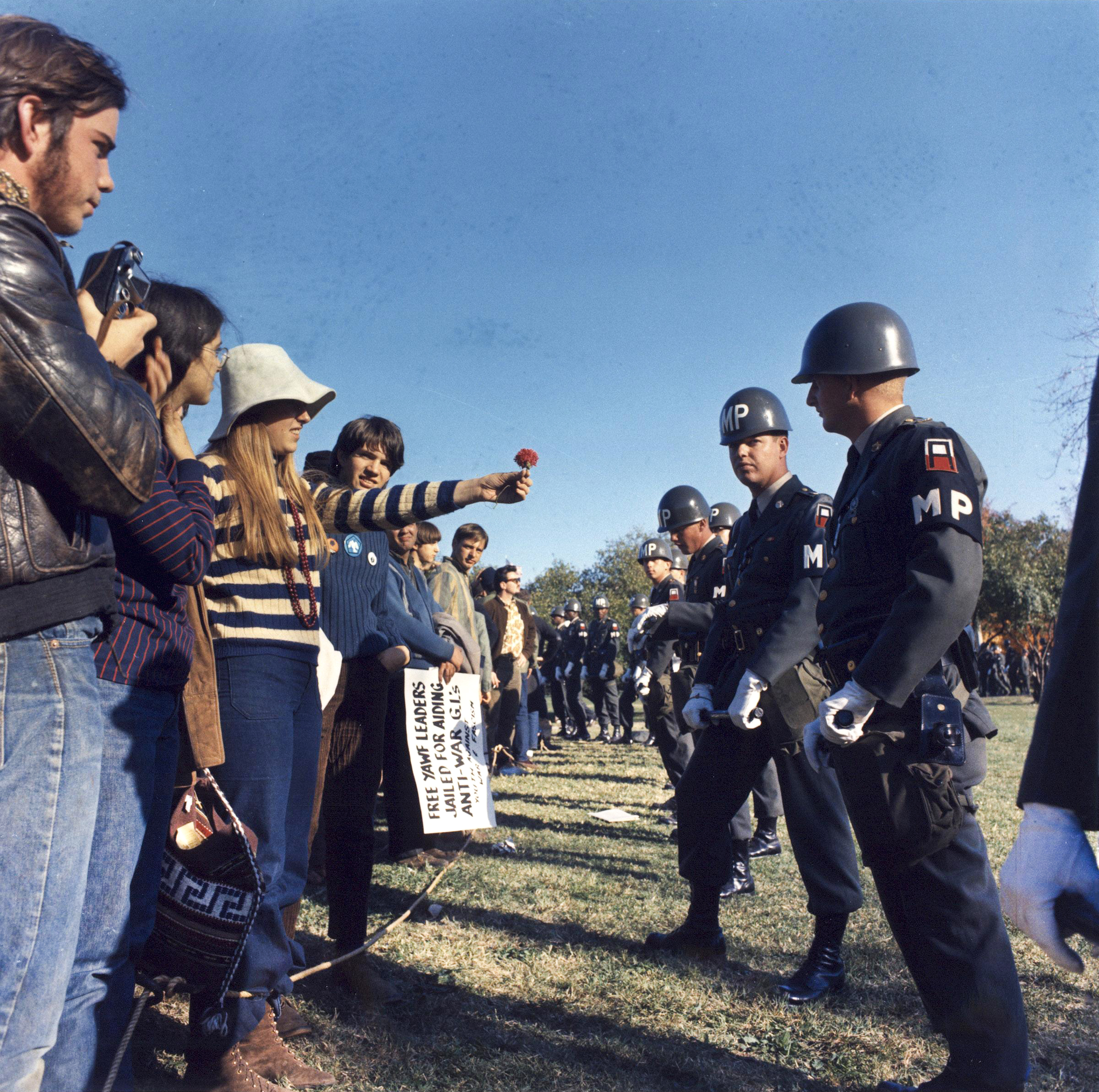
A female demonstrator offers a flower to a soldier during the 1967 March on the Pentagon anti-Vietnam War protest.

By the middle of 1967 nearly 70,000 Americans had been killed or wounded in the war, which was being commonly described in the news media and elsewhere as a "stalemate." In January and February, probes were made to assess North Vietnamese's willingness to discuss peace, but they fell on deaf ears. Ho Chi Minh declared that the only solution was a unilateral U.S. withdrawal. A Gallup, Inc. poll in July 1967 showed that 52 percent of Americans disapproved of the president's handling of the war, and only 34 percent thought progress was being made. Nonetheless, Johnson agreed to an increase of 55,000 troops, bringing the total to 525,000. In August, Johnson, with the Joint Chiefs' support, decided to expand the air campaign and exempted only Hanoi, Haiphong and a buffer zone with China from the target list. Later that month McNamara told a Senate subcommittee that an expanded air campaign would not bring Hanoi to the peace table. The Joint Chiefs were astounded, and threatened mass resignation; McNamara was summoned to the White House for a three-hour dressing down. Nevertheless, Johnson had received reports from the CIA confirming McNamara's analysis at least in part. In the meantime an election establishing a constitutional government in the South was concluded and provided hope for peace talks.

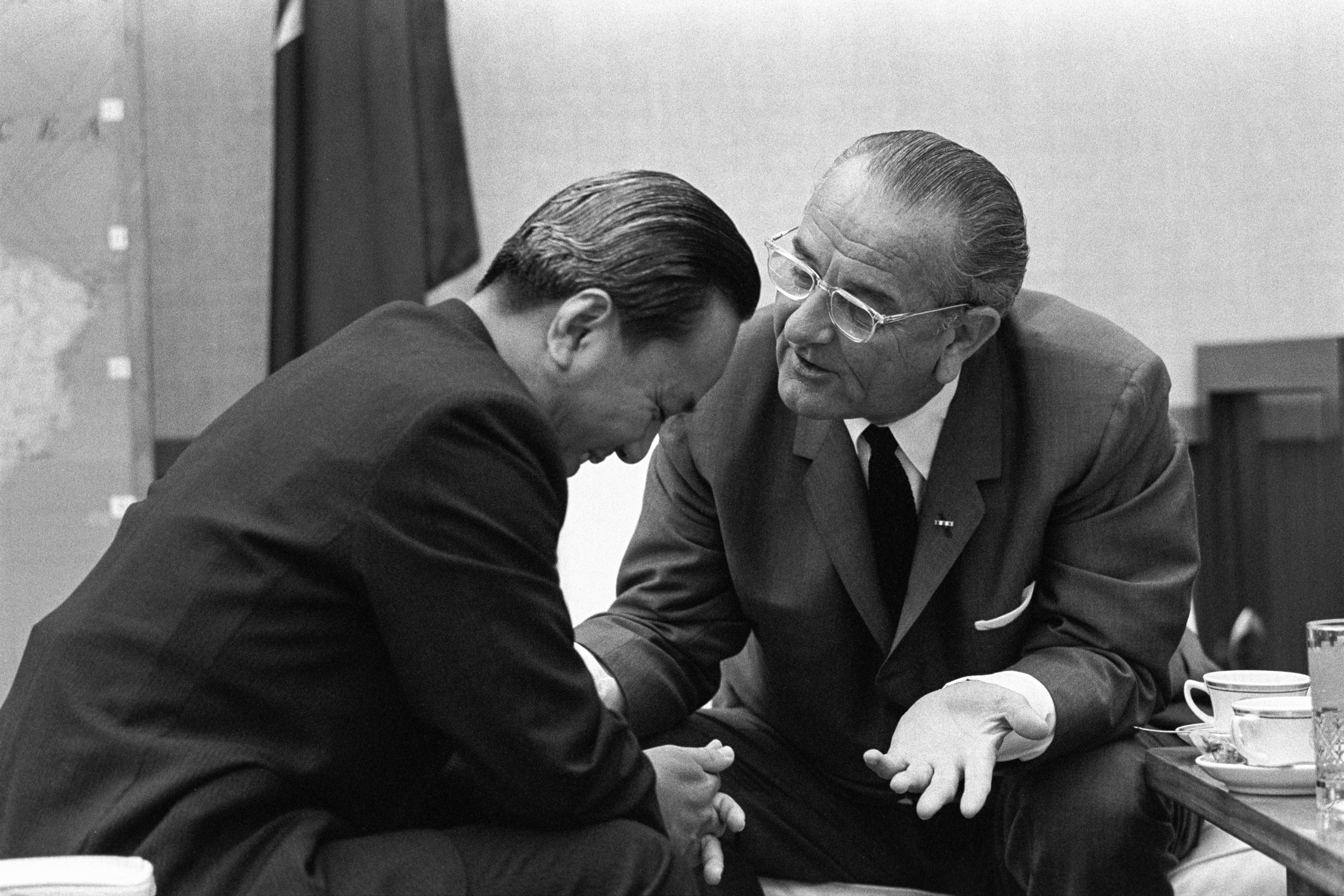
President Johnson and South Vietnamese President Nguyễn Văn Thiệu in Honolulu

With the war arguably in a stalemate and in light of the widespread disapproval of the conflict, Johnson convened a group of veteran government foreign policy experts, informally known as "the Wise Men": Dean Acheson, General Omar Bradley, George Ball, McGeorge Bundy, Arthur Dean, C. Douglas Dillon, Abe Fortas, Averell Harriman, Henry Cabot Lodge, Robert Daniel Murphy, and Maxwell D. Taylor. They unanimously opposed leaving Vietnam, and encouraged Johnson to "stay the course." Afterward, on November 17, in a nationally televised address, the president assured the American public, "We are inflicting greater losses than we're taking...We are making progress." Less than two weeks later, Robert McNamara announced his resignation as Defense Secretary. Behind closed doors, he had begun regularly expressing doubts over Johnson's war strategy, angering the president. He joined a growing list of Johnson's top aides who resigned over the war, including Bill Moyers, McGeorge Bundy, and George Ball. In October, with ever-increasing public protests against the war, Johnson engaged the FBI and the CIA to investigate, monitor, and undermine anti-war activists. In mid-October, there was a demonstration of 100,000 at the Pentagon; Johnson and Dean Rusk were convinced that foreign communist sources were behind the demonstration, but that was refuted in the CIA's findings.

==== Tet Offensive ====
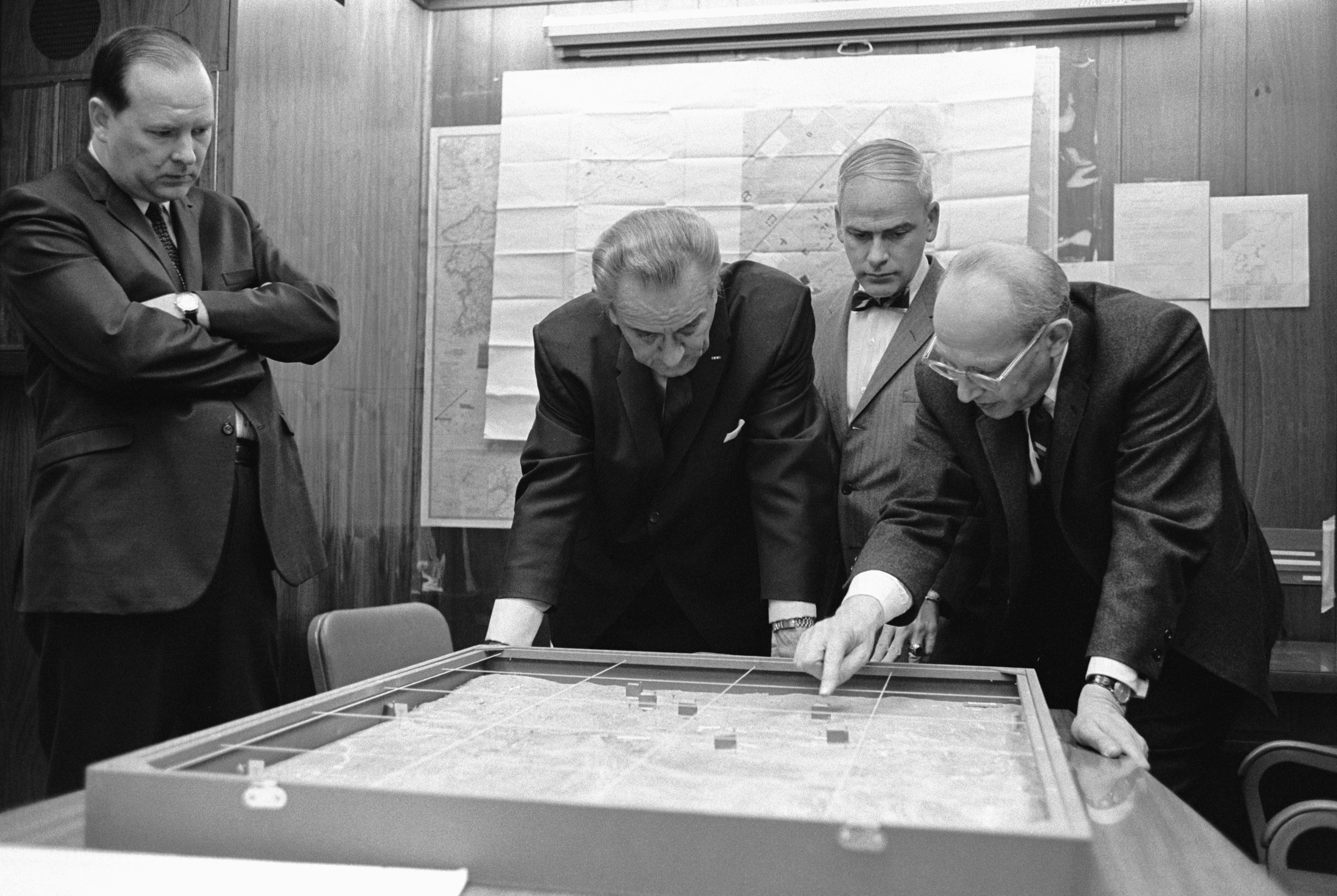
Walt Rostow, Johnson's national security advisor, meeting with Johnson in the Situation Room in 1968, where the two reviewed a map of the region where the Battle of Khe Sanh was being waged

On January 30, 1968, the Viet Cong and the North Vietnamese Army began the Tet Offensive against South Vietnam's five largest cities, including Saigon. While the Tet Offensive failed militarily, it was a psychological victory, definitively turning American public opinion against the war effort. In February 1968, influential news anchor Walter Cronkite of CBS News expressed on the air that the conflict was deadlocked and that additional fighting would change nothing. Johnson reacted, saying "If I've lost Cronkite, I've lost middle America". Indeed, demoralization about the war was everywhere; 26 percent then approved of Johnson's handling of Vietnam, while 63 percent disapproved. College students and others protested, burned draft cards, and chanted, "Hey, hey, LBJ, how many kids did you kill today?"

The Tet Offensive convinced senior leaders of the Johnson administration, including the "Wise Men" and new Defense Secretary Clark Clifford, that further escalation of troop levels would not help bring an end to the war. Johnson was initially reluctant to follow this advice, but ultimately agreed to allow a partial bombing halt and to signal his willingness to engage in peace talks. On March 31, 1968, Johnson announced that he would halt the bombing in North Vietnam, while at the same time announcing that he would not seek re-election. He also escalated U.S. military operations in South Vietnam in order to consolidate control of as much of the countryside as possible before the onset of serious peace talks. Talks began in Paris in May, but failed to yield any results. Two of the major obstacles in negotiations were the unwillingness of the United States to allow the Viet Cong to take part in the South Vietnamese government, and the unwillingness of North Vietnam to recognize the legitimacy of South Vietnam. In October 1968, when the parties came close to an agreement on a bombing halt, Republican presidential nominee Richard Nixon intervened with the South Vietnamese, promising better terms so as to delay a settlement on the issue until after the election. Johnson sought a continuation of talks after the 1968 election, but the North Vietnamese argued about procedural matters until after Nixon took office.

=== Dominican Republic ===
Like President Kennedy, Johnson sought to isolate Cuba, which was under the rule of the Soviet-aligned Fidel Castro.

In 1965, the Dominican Civil War broke out between the government of President Donald Reid Cabral and supporters of former president Juan Bosch. On the advice of Abe Fortas, Johnson dispatched over 20,000 Marines to the Dominican Republic. Their role was not take sides but to evacuate American citizens and restore order. The U.S. also helped arrange an agreement providing for new elections. Johnson's use of force in ending the civil war alienated many in Latin America, and the region's importance to the administration receded as Johnson's foreign policy became increasingly dominated by the Vietnam War.

=== Soviet Union ===
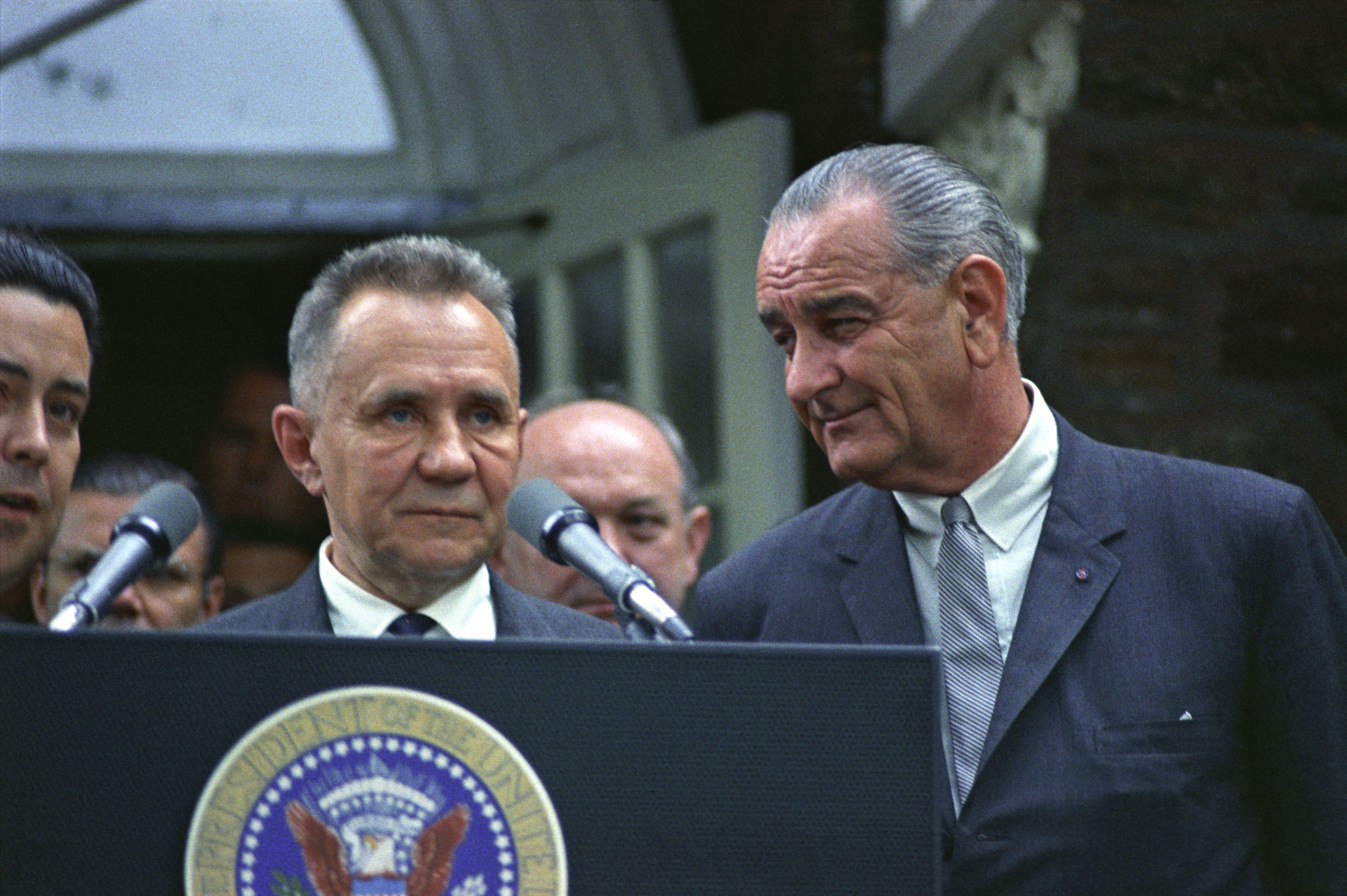
Soviet Premier Alexei Kosygin (left) next to Johnson during the Glassboro Summit Conference

Though actively engaged in containment in Southeast Asia, the Middle East and Latin America, Johnson made it a priority to seek arms control deals with Moscow. The Soviet Union also sought closer relations to the United States during the mid-to-late 1960s, partly due to the increasingly worse Sino-Soviet split. Johnson attempted to reduce tensions with China by easing restrictions on trade, but the beginning of China's Cultural Revolution ended hopes of a greater rapprochement. Johnson was concerned with averting the possibility of nuclear war, and he sought to reduce tensions in Europe. The Johnson administration pursued arms control agreements with the Soviet Union, signing the Outer Space Treaty and the Treaty on the Non-Proliferation of Nuclear Weapons, and laid the foundation for the Strategic Arms Limitation Talks. Johnson held a largely amicable meeting with Soviet Premier Alexei Kosygin at the Glassboro Summit Conference in 1967, and in July 1968 the United States, Britain, and the Soviet Union signed the Non-Proliferation Treaty, in which each signatory agreed not to help other countries develop or acquire nuclear weapons. A planned nuclear disarmament summit between the United States and the Soviet Union was scuttled after Soviet forces violently suppressed the Prague Spring, an attempted democratization of Czechoslovakia.

=== Surveillance of Martin Luther King ===
Johnson continued the FBI's wiretapping of Martin Luther King Jr. authorized by the Kennedy administration under Attorney General Robert F. Kennedy. Johnson also authorized the tapping of phone conversations of others, including the Vietnamese friends of a Nixon associate.

=== International trips ===
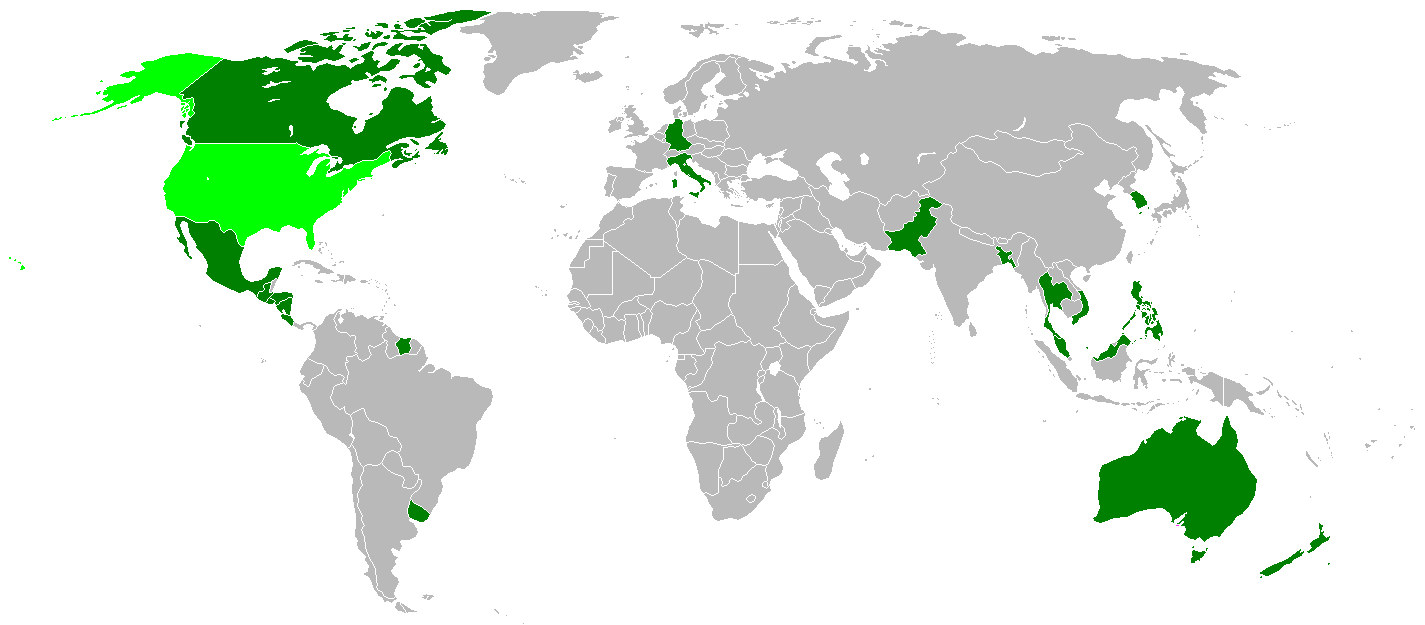
Countries visited by Johnson during his presidency

Johnson made eleven international trips to twenty countries during his presidency. He flew five hundred twenty-three thousand miles (841,690 km) aboard Air Force One while in office. His October 1966 visit to Australia sparked demonstrations from anti-war protesters. One of the most unusual international trips in presidential history occurred before Christmas 1967. The President began the trip by going to the memorial for Australian Prime Minister Harold Holt, who was presumed drowned in a swimming accident. The White House did not reveal in advance to the press that the President would make the first round-the-world presidential trip. The trip was twenty-six thousand nine hundred fifty-nine miles (43,386.3 km) completed in only 112.5 hours (4.7 days). Air Force One crossed the equator twice, stopped at Travis Air Force Base, in Honolulu, Pago Pago, Canberra, Melbourne, Vietnam, Karachi, and Rome.

=== 1968 presidential election ===
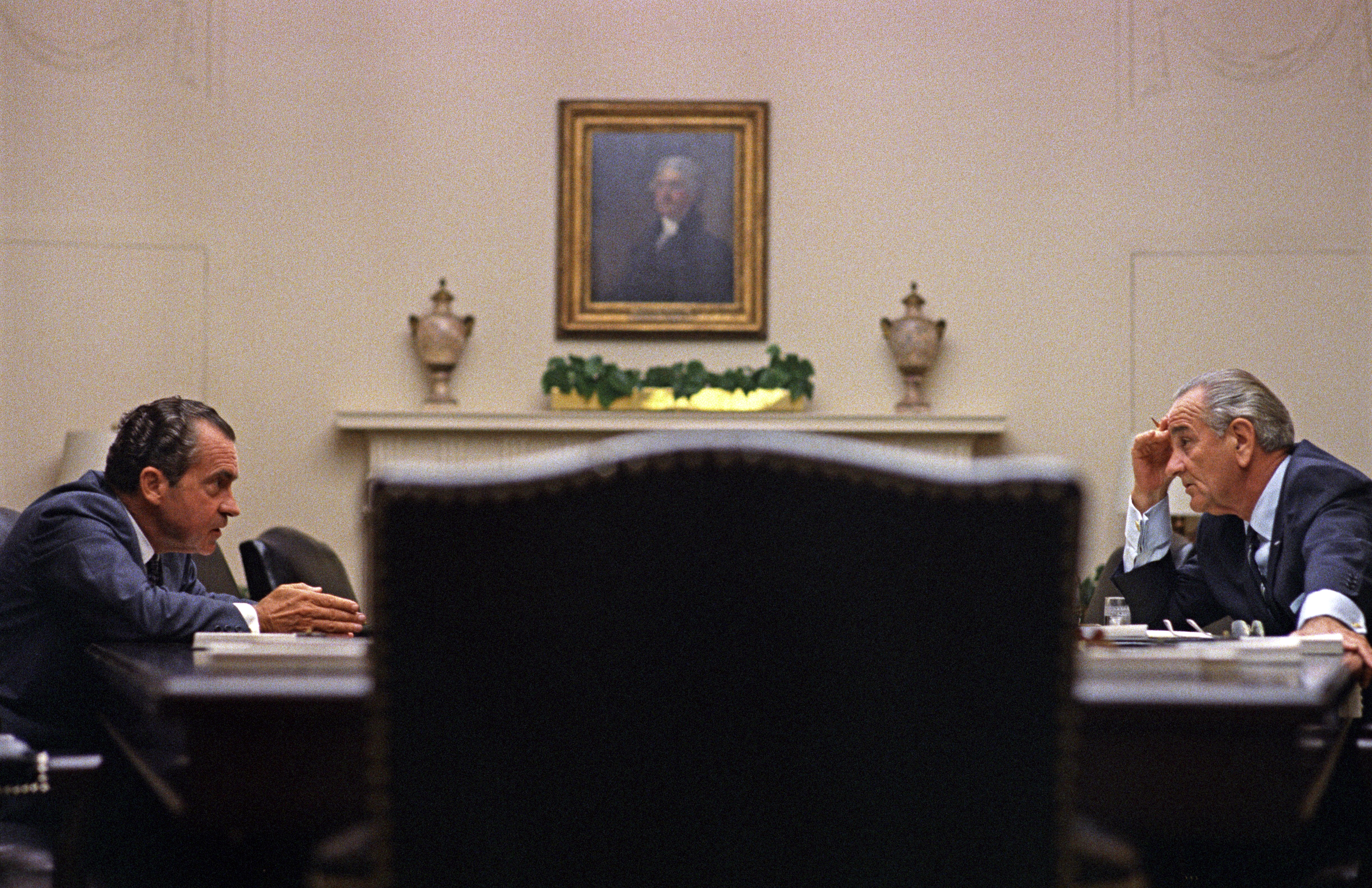
Johnson meeting with Republican presidential candidate Richard Nixon in the White House in July 1968

As he had served less than two years of President Kennedy's term, Johnson was constitutionally eligible for election to a second full term in the 1968 presidential election. Despite Johnson's growing unpopularity, conventional wisdom held that it would be impossible to deny re-nomination to a sitting president. In September 1967 Johnson openly admitted he was considering dropping out of the race for re-election. Johnson won a narrow victory in the New Hampshire presidential primary on March 12, but in a March 31 speech, Johnson shocked the nation when he announced he would not run for re-election by concluding with the line: "I shall not seek, and I will not accept, the nomination of my party for another term as your president". The next day, his approval ratings increased from 36 percent to 49 percent.

Historians have debated the factors that led to Johnson's surprise decision. Shesol says Johnson wanted out of the White House but also wanted vindication; when the indicators turned negative he decided to leave. Woods writes that Johnson realized he needed to leave in order for the nation to heal. Dallek says that Johnson had no further domestic goals, and realized that his personality had eroded his popularity. His health was not good, and he was preoccupied with the Kennedy campaign; his wife was pressing for his retirement and his base of support continued to shrink. Leaving the race would allow him to pose as a peacemaker. Bennett, however, says Johnson "had been forced out of a reelection race in 1968 by outrage over his policy in Southeast Asia." Johnson may also have hoped that the convention would ultimately choose to draft him back into the race.

Vice President Hubert Humphrey entered the race after Johnson's withdrawal, making the 1968 Democratic primaries a three-way contest between Humphrey, Kennedy, and McCarthy. Kennedy cut into McCarthy's liberal and anti-war base, while also winning the support of the poor and working class. He won a series of primary victories, but was assassinated in June by Sirhan Sirhan, an Arab nationalist. With Johnson's support, Humphrey won the presidential nomination at the tumultuous 1968 Democratic National Convention, held in Chicago in late August. Violent police attacks against anti-war protesters in Chicago marred the convention.

Humphrey's polling numbers improved after a September 30 speech in which he broke with Johnson's war policy, calling for an end to the bombing of North Vietnam. In what was termed the October surprise, Johnson announced to the nation on October 31, 1968, that he had ordered a complete cessation of "all air, naval and artillery bombardment of North Vietnam", effective November 1, should the North Vietnamese government be willing to negotiate and citing progress with the Paris peace talks.

Republican nominee Richard Nixon won the election.

=== Judicial appointments ===
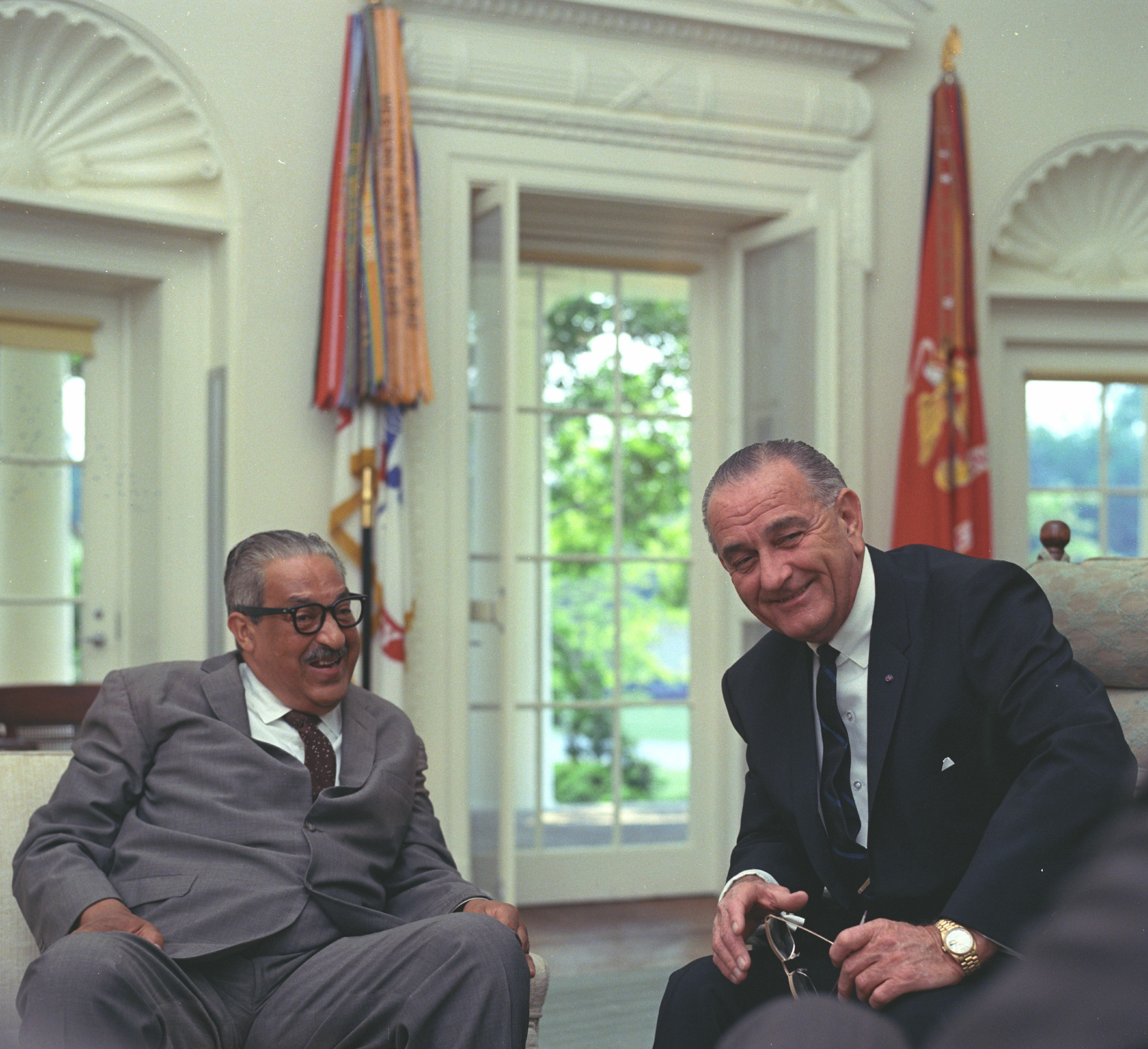
Appointed by Johnson in 1967, Thurgood Marshall (left) became the first African American on the U.S. Supreme Court

Johnson appointed Justices Abe Fortas (1965) and Thurgood Marshall (1967) to the Supreme Court of the United States. Johnson anticipated court challenges to his legislative measures in 1965 and thought it advantageous to have a "mole" in the Supreme Court to provide him with inside information, as he was able to get from the legislative branch. Abe Fortas in particular Johnson thought could fill the bill. The opportunity arose when an opening occurred for ambassador to the UN, with Adlai Stevenson's death; Associate Justice Arthur Goldberg accepted Johnson's offer to transfer to the UN position. Johnson insisted on Fortas assuming Goldberg's seat, over Fortas's wife's objection that it was too early in his career. When Earl Warren announced his retirement in 1968, Johnson nominated Fortas to succeed him as Chief Justice of the United States, and nominated Homer Thornberry to succeed Fortas as associate justice. However, Fortas's nomination was filibustered by senators, and neither nominee was voted upon by the full Senate.

== Post-presidency (1969–1973) ==
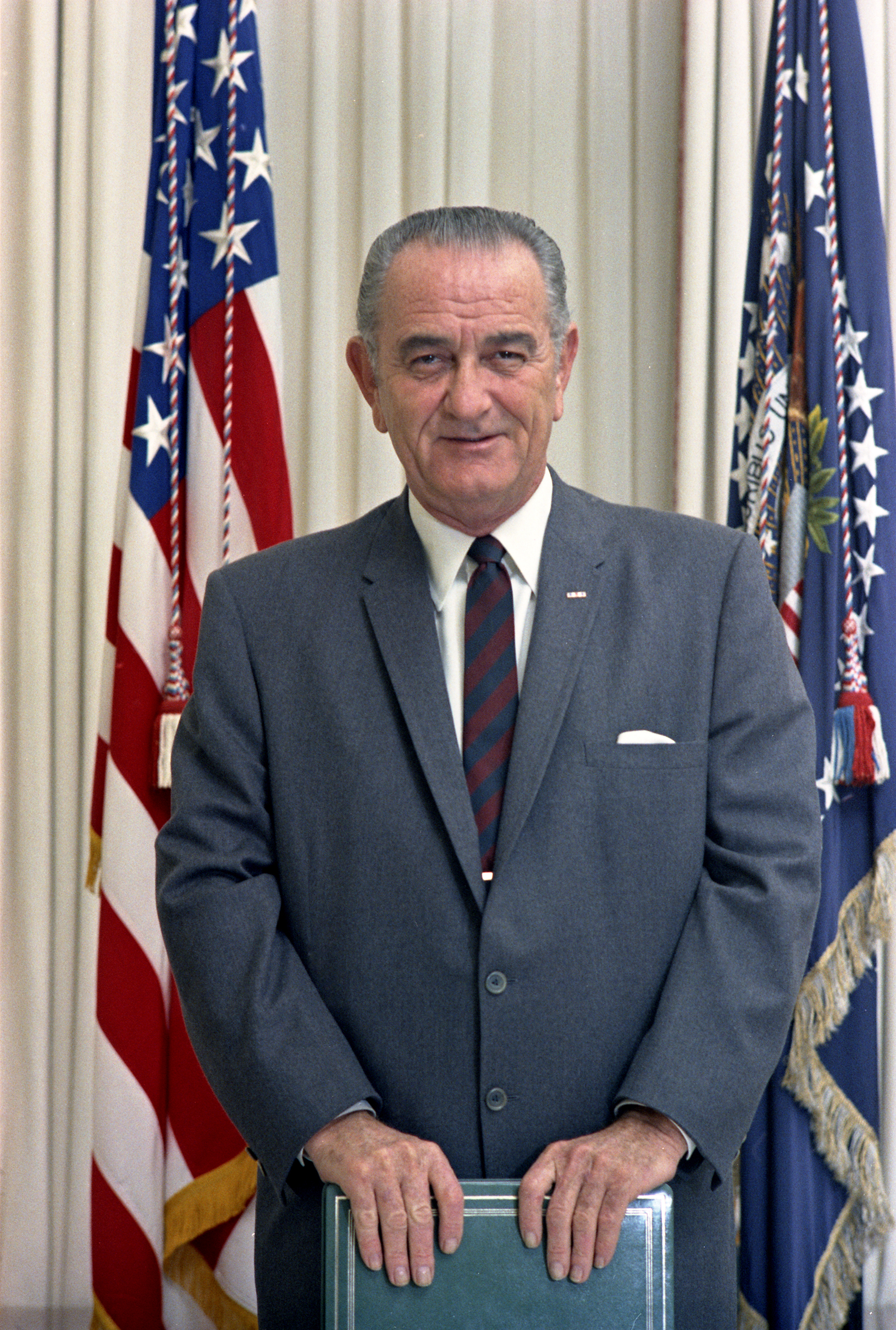
Portrait of Johnson taken nine days before leaving office in 1969

On Inauguration Day (January 20, 1969), Johnson saw Nixon sworn in, then got on the plane to fly back to Texas. When the front door of the plane closed, Johnson pulled out a cigarette ‍—‌ his first cigarette he had smoked since his heart attack in 1955. One of his daughters pulled it out of his mouth and said, "Daddy, what are you doing? You're going to kill yourself." He took it back and said, "I've now raised you, girls. I've now been President. Now it's my time!" From that point on, he went into a very self-destructive spiral.

— Historian Michael Beschloss

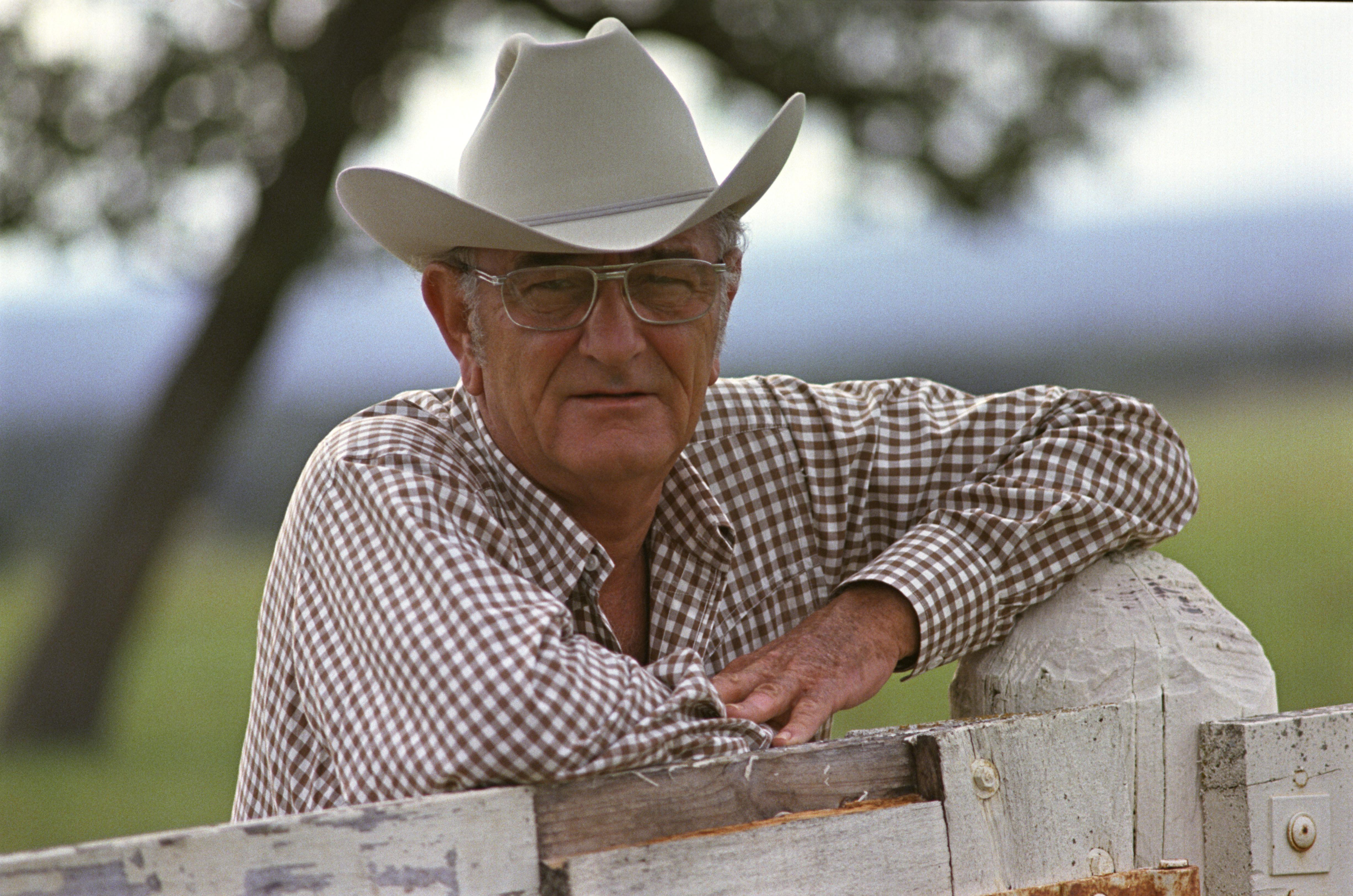
Johnson at his Texas ranch, 1972

After leaving the presidency in January 1969, Johnson went home to his ranch in Stonewall, Texas, accompanied by former aide and speechwriter Harry J. Middleton, who would draft Johnson's first book, The Choices We Face, and work with him on his memoirs, The Vantage Point: Perspectives of the Presidency 1963–1969, published in 1971. That year, the Lyndon Baines Johnson Library and Museum opened on the campus of The University of Texas at Austin. He donated his Texas ranch in his will to the public to form the Lyndon B. Johnson National Historical Park, with the provision that it "remain a working ranch and not become a sterile relic of the past".

Johnson gave Nixon high grades in foreign policy, but worried that his successor was being pressured into removing U.S. forces from South Vietnam before the South Vietnamese were able to defend themselves. "If the South falls to the Communists, we can have a serious backlash here at home", he warned. During the 1972 presidential election, Johnson only reluctantly endorsed Democratic nominee George McGovern, a senator from South Dakota; McGovern had long opposed Johnson's foreign and defense policies. Johnson wanted to attend the 1972 Democratic National Convention, but was advised not to attend as he would not be welcome and he was still immensely unpopular. The McGovern nomination and platform dismayed him. Nixon could be defeated, Johnson insisted, "if only the Democrats don't go too far left". Johnson felt Edmund Muskie would be more likely to defeat Nixon; however, he declined to try to stop McGovern receiving the nomination as he felt his unpopularity within the Democratic Party was such that anything he said was more likely to help McGovern. McGovern ultimately lost the 1972 election in one of the biggest landslides in American history. Johnson's protégé John Connally had served as President Nixon's Secretary of the Treasury and then stepped down to head "Democrats for Nixon", a group funded by Republicans. It was the first time that Connally and Johnson were on opposite sides of a general election campaign.

== Personal life ==
=== Marriage and children ===
On November 17, 1934, Johnson married Claudia Alta "Lady Bird" Taylor from Karnack, Texas. The two first met after he attended Georgetown University Law Center in Washington, D.C. for one semester. During their first date, Johnson asked her to marry him; many dates later, she finally agreed. The wedding was officiated by Arthur R. McKinstry at St. Mark's Episcopal Church in San Antonio. They had two daughters: Lynda Bird in 1944 and Luci Baines in 1947. Johnson gave his children names with the LBJ initials as a family tradition; his dog was named Little Beagle Johnson, and his home was the LBJ Ranch in the Texas Hill Country. His initials were on his cufflinks, ashtrays, and clothes. During his marriage, Johnson had affairs with "numerous" women, including socialite Alice Marsh, who was considered, outside his marriage, his most important relationship.

=== Health issues ===
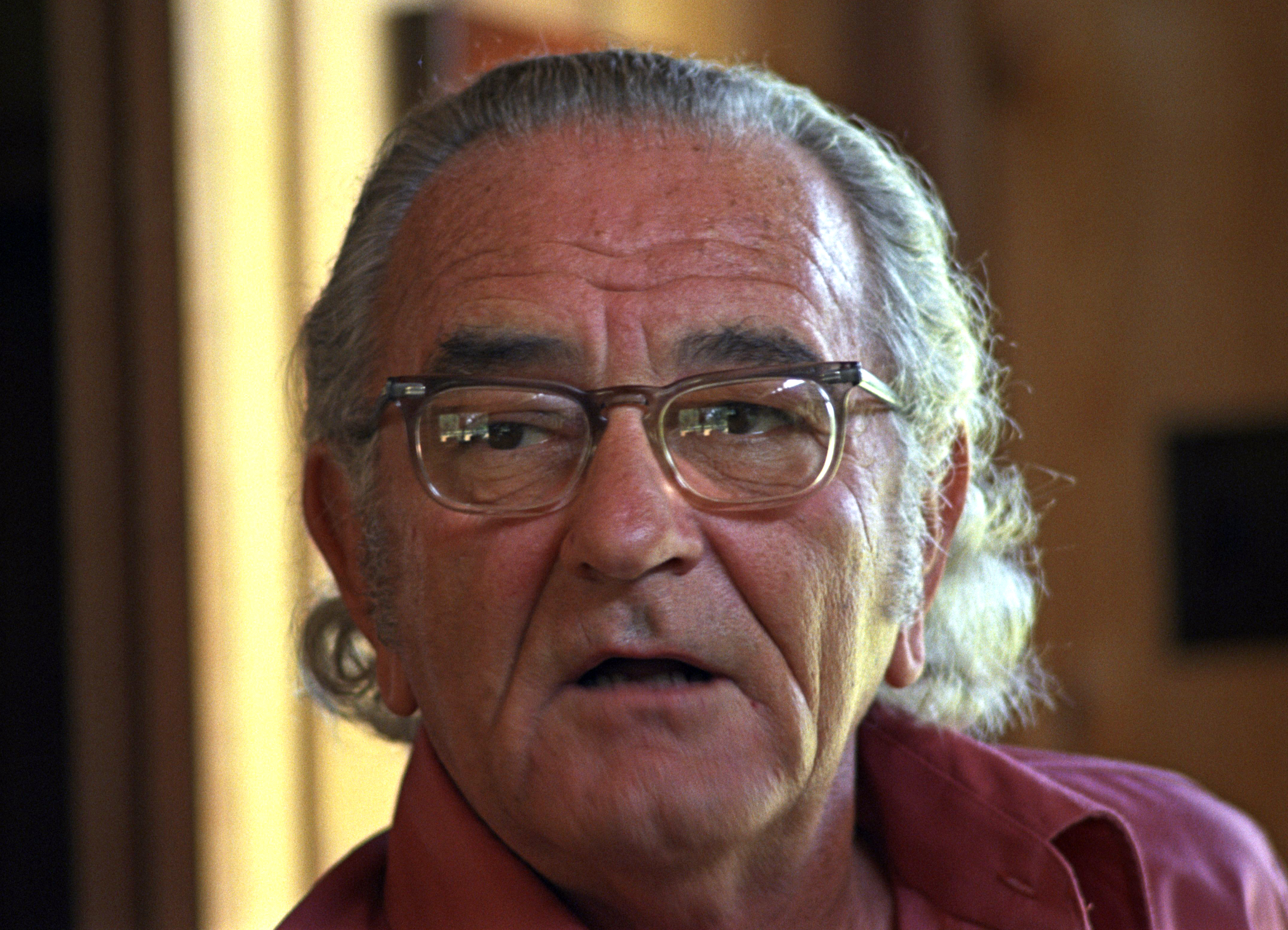
Johnson with longer hair during an interview in August 1972, five months before his death

On July 2, 1955, at age 46, Johnson, a 60-cigarette-per-day smoker and a relentless workaholic who often worked for up to 20 hours a day, suffered a near-fatal heart attack, which inspired him to discontinue smoking. Five months later after recuperating at home, Johnson's doctors reported he had made "a most satisfactory recovery".

It is believed that Johnson may have suffered a second heart attack following President Kennedy's assassination, but the diagnosis released to the public was that he had a minor angina attack.

On November 8, 1965, Johnson underwent surgery at Bethesda Naval Hospital to remove his gallbladder and a kidney stone. After the procedure, Johnson's doctors reported that the president had come through the surgery "beautifully as expected." He was able to resume his duties the following day, and he met with reporters a couple of days later to reassure the nation that he was recovering well. Although Johnson was incapacitated during surgery, there was no transfer of presidential power to Vice President Humphrey.

In March 1970, Johnson suffered an attack of angina and was taken to Brooke Army General Hospital in San Antonio. He had gained more than 25 pounds (11 kg) since leaving the White House; he now weighed around 235 pounds (107 kg) and was urged to lose considerable weight. By the summer of 1970, again gripped by chronic chest pains, Johnson lost 15 pounds (6.8 kg) in less than a month on a crash water diet. He had also resumed smoking heavily shortly before Christmas 1971, having not smoked since his near-fatal heart attack in July 1955.

In April 1972, Johnson had another major heart attack while visiting his daughter, Lynda, in Charlottesville Virginia. "I'm hurting real bad", he confided to friends and rushed back to Texas against the advice of local doctors where he was admitted back to Brook General Army Hospital and stayed in the intensive care unit. The chest pains returned nearly every afternoon—jolting pains that left him frightened and breathless. A portable oxygen tank was kept by his bed, and he periodically interrupted what he was doing to lie down and don the mask. He continued to smoke heavily and maintained a low-calorie, low-cholesterol diet only intermittently while eating mostly unhealthy foods. Meanwhile, he began to experience severe abdominal pains, diagnosed as diverticulosis. His heart condition rapidly worsened and surgery was recommended. Johnson flew to Houston to consult with heart specialist Michael DeBakey, where he learned his condition was terminal. DeBakey found that despite two of Johnson's coronary arteries being in urgent need of a coronary bypass operation, his heart was in such poor condition that the former president would have likely died during surgery.

== Death ==
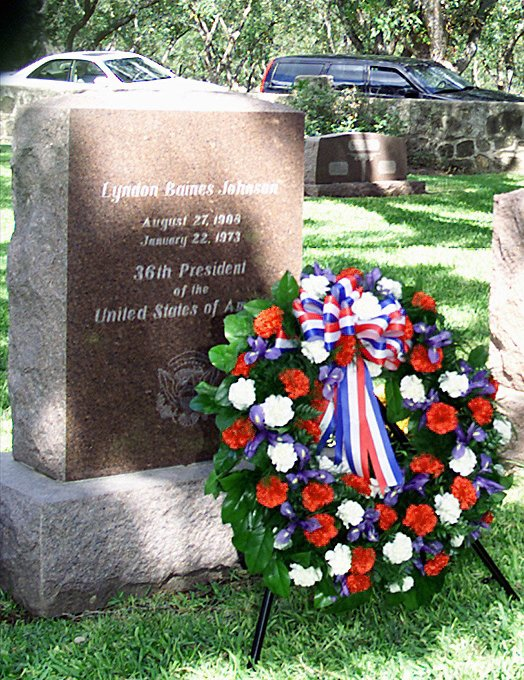
Johnson's grave at the Johnson Family Cemetery in Stonewall, Texas

Johnson recorded an hour-long television interview with newsman Walter Cronkite at his ranch on January 12, 1973, in which he discussed his legacy, particularly about the civil rights movement. He was still smoking heavily, and told Cronkite that it was better for his heart "to smoke than to be nervous".

At approximately 3:50 P.M. Central on January 22, 1973, Johnson suffered his final heart attack in his bedroom. He managed to telephone the Secret Service detail on the ranch, shouting his last words, "Send Mike immediately!" He was referring to Mike Howard, one of the agents assigned to protect the former president, who found him still holding the telephone receiver, unconscious and "appear[ing] to be dead". They attempted resuscitation, and Johnson was airlifted in one of his planes to San Antonio International Airport, en route to Brooke Army Medical Center. However, cardiologist and Army colonel George McGranahan pronounced him dead on arrival at the airport at 4:33 P.M. Johnson was 64.

Shortly after the former president was pronounced dead, Johnson's press secretary Tom Johnson (no relation) telephoned Cronkite to tell him. Cronkite was anchoring CBS Evening News live at the moment the news about Johnson reached him, which enabled him to report on President Johnson's death as he received direct information. Nixon mentioned Johnson's death in a speech he gave the day after Johnson died, announcing the peace agreement to end the Vietnam War.

=== Funeral ===
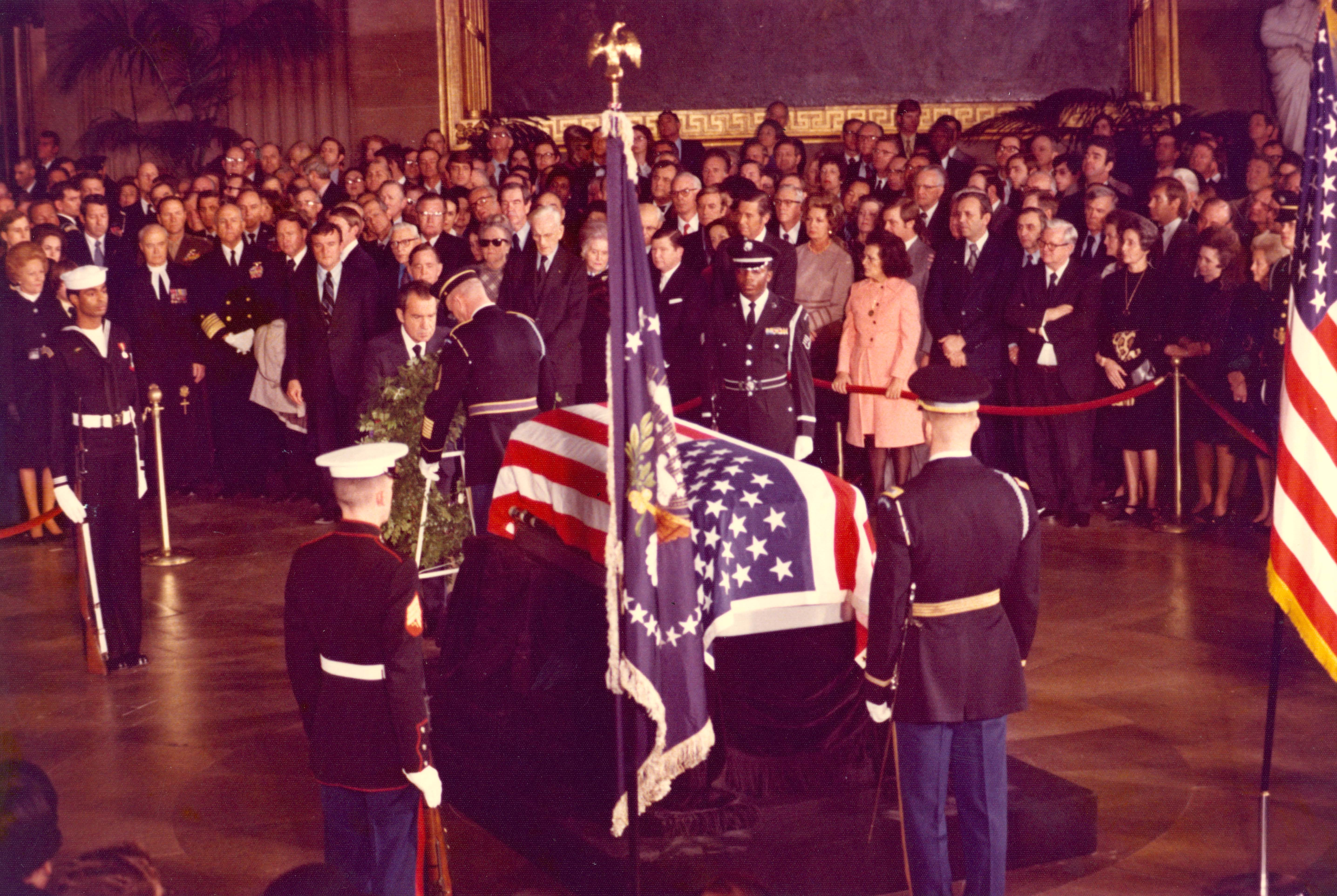
President Richard Nixon paying his last tributes to his predecessor, former president Johnson in 1973

Johnson was honored with a state funeral. His body initially lay in repose at the LBJ Presidential Library in Austin, Texas, before being flown to Washington, D.C. He lay in state at the U.S. Capitol, where J. J. Pickle and former Secretary of State Dean Rusk delivered eulogies.

The state funeral service took place on January 25, 1973, at the National City Christian Church in Washington, D.C., where Johnson had worshiped while president. The service was presided over by President Nixon and attended by foreign dignitaries, including Eisaku Satō, who had served as prime minister of Japan during Johnson's presidency. Eulogies were delivered by George Davis, the church's pastor, and W. Marvin Watson, Johnson's last postmaster general and a longtime adviser.

Later that day, Johnson was buried in his family's private cemetery in Gillespie County, Texas, near the house in which he was born. Reverend Billy Graham officiated the burial service, and former Texas governor John Connally delivered a eulogy; several hundred people attended.

The state funeral—the last for a president until Richard Nixon's in 1994—occurred the same week as Nixon's second inauguration. Because Johnson died two days after the inauguration, out of respect in the period of mourning some inauguration-related activities were canceled.

== Personality and public image ==
According to biographer Randall Woods, Johnson posed in many different roles:

"Johnson the Son of the Tenant Farmer, Johnson the Great Compromiser, Johnson the All-Knowing, Johnson the Humble, Johnson the Warrior, Johnson the Dove, Johnson the Romantic, Johnson the Hard-Headed Pragmatist, Johnson the Preserver of Traditions, Johnson the Crusader for Social Justice, Johnson the Magnanimous, Johnson the Vindictive or Johnson the Uncouth, LBJ the Hick, Lyndon the Satyr, and Johnson the Usurper".

Johnson was often described as an ambitious, tireless, and imposing figure who was highly effective at securing the passage of legislation, reportedly working 18- to 20-hour days with few breaks or leisure activities. He employed a distinctive method of political persuasion, known as "The Johnson Treatment". This included maintaining biographies of all U.S. Senators, learning their ambitions, hopes, and personal preferences, and using his height of 6 feet 3 1/2 inches (1.92 m) to physically intimidate them in order to secure votes. Robert Dallek wrote of Johnson, "There was no more powerful majority leader in American history", while Doris Kearns Goodwin noted that he "could get up every day and learn what their fears, their desires, their wishes, their wants were and he could then manipulate, dominate, persuade and cajole them". As president, Johnson vetoed 30 bills; no other president in history vetoed as many bills without having a single veto overridden by Congress.

Johnson's cowboy hat and boots reflected his Texas roots and love of the rural hill country. From 250 acres (100 ha) of land that he was given by an aunt in 1951, he created a 2,700-acre (1,100 ha) working ranch with 400 cattle. The National Park Service keeps a herd descended from Johnson's and maintains the ranch property.

Biographer Randall Woods argues that Social Gospel themes Johnson learned from childhood allowed him to transform social problems into moral problems. This helps explain his longtime commitment to social justice, and explicitly inspired his foreign-policy approach to Christian internationalism and nation-building. For example, in a 1966 speech he quoted at length from the Social Creed of the Methodist Church, adding "It would be very hard for me to write a more perfect description of the American ideal."

== Legacy ==
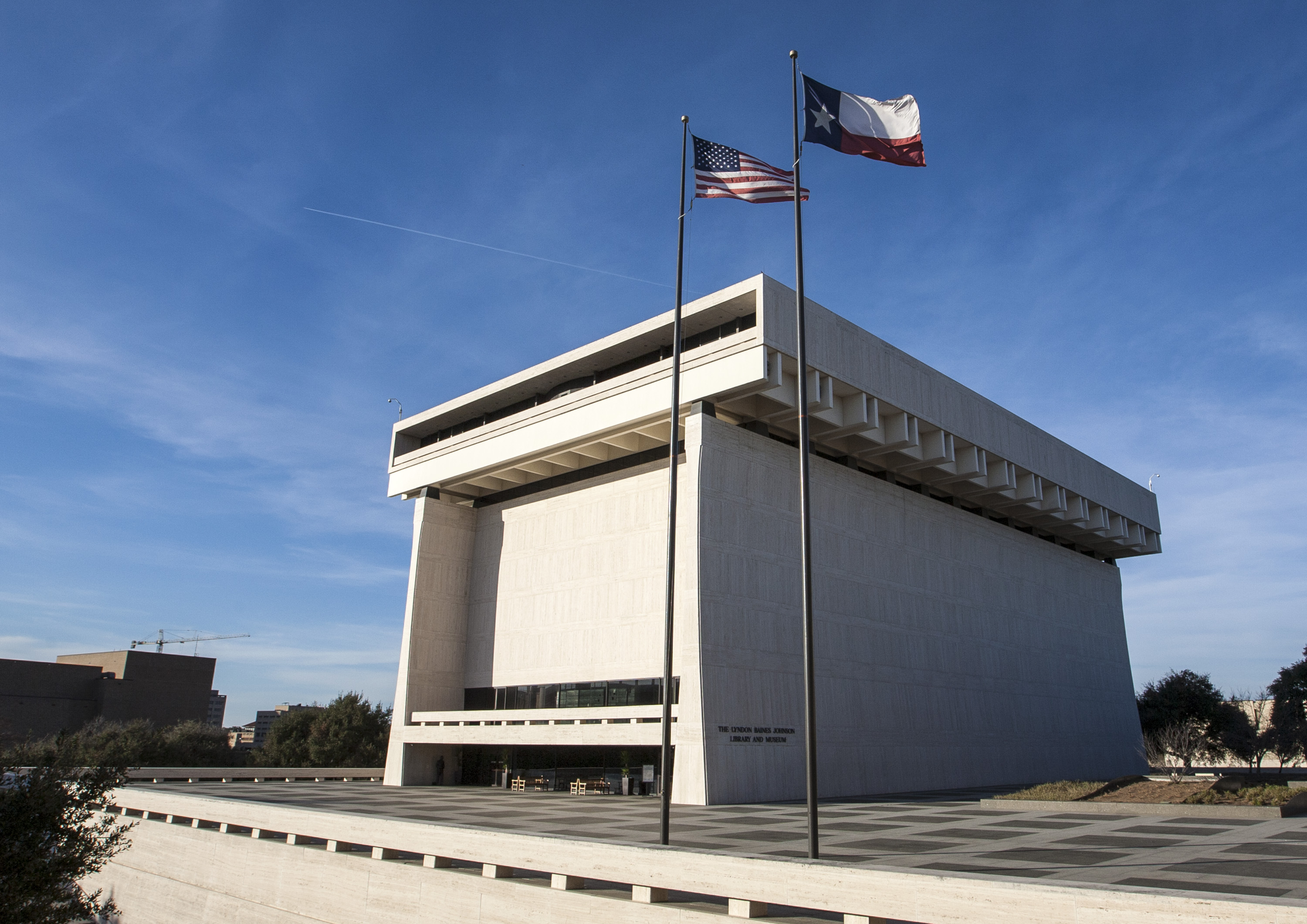
The Lyndon Baines Johnson Library and Museum located on the University of Texas at Austin campus

Scholars have viewed Johnson through the lens of both his legislative achievements and his lack of success in the Vietnam War. His overall rating among historians has remained relatively steady, and his average ranking is higher than any of the eight presidents who followed him, although similar to Reagan and Clinton. In public polling of presidential favorability of Johnson and the presidents who succeeded him Johnson tends to appear more toward the bottom of lists, typically excepting Donald Trump, George W. Bush and Richard Nixon, and sometimes Gerald Ford.

Historian Kent Germany explains:

The man who was elected to the White House by one of the widest margins in U.S. history and pushed through as much legislation as any other American politician now seems to be remembered best by the public for succeeding an assassinated hero, steering the country into a quagmire in Vietnam, cheating on his saintly wife, exposing his stitched-up belly, using profanity, picking up dogs by their ears, swimming naked with advisers in the White House pool, and emptying his bowels while conducting official business. Of all those issues, Johnson's reputation suffers the most from his management of the Vietnam War, something that has overshadowed his civil rights and domestic policy accomplishments and caused Johnson himself to regret his handling of "the woman I really loved ‍—‌ the Great Society."

=== Memorials ===
The Manned Spacecraft Center in Houston was renamed the Lyndon B. Johnson Space Center in 1973, and the United States Department of Education headquarters was named after Johnson in 2007. The Lyndon B. Johnson School of Public Affairs at the University of Texas at Austin was named in his honor, as is the Lyndon B. Johnson National Grassland. Also named for him are schools in Austin and Laredo, Texas; Melbourne, Florida; and Jackson, Kentucky. Interstate 635 in Dallas is named the Lyndon B. Johnson Freeway. The Lyndon Baines Johnson Memorial Grove on the Potomac was dedicated in 1976.

Johnson was awarded the Presidential Medal of Freedom posthumously in 1980. Texas created a state holiday on August 27 to mark Johnson's birthday, known as Lyndon Baines Johnson Day.

=== Major legislation signed ===
- 1963: Clean Air Act
- 1963: Higher Education Facilities Act
- 1963: Vocational Education Act
- 1964: Civil Rights Act
- 1964: Urban Mass Transportation Act
- 1964: Wilderness Act
- 1964: Nurse Training Act
- 1964: Food Stamp Act
- 1964: Economic Opportunity Act
- 1965: Housing and Urban Development Act
- 1965: Higher Education Act
- 1965: Older Americans Act
- 1965: Coinage Act
- 1965: Social Security Act
- 1965: Voting Rights Act
- 1965: Immigration and Nationality Services Act
- 1966: Animal Welfare Act
- 1966: Freedom of Information Act
- 1967: Age Discrimination in Employment Act
- 1967: Public Broadcasting Act
- 1968: Architectural Barriers Act
- 1968: Bilingual Education Act
- 1968: Civil Rights Act
- 1968: Gun Control Act

=== Significant regulatory changes ===
- 1968: FCC creates national emergency number 9-1-1

== Works ==
- National Aeronautics and Space Act (1962)
- Choices We Face (1969)
- The Vantage Point (1971)

== See also ==
- Electoral history of Lyndon B. Johnson
- Family of Lyndon B. Johnson
- History of the United States (1945–1964)
- History of the United States (1964–1980)
- Holocaust Museum Houston
- Johnson Doctrine
- List of presidents of the United States
- List of presidents of the United States by previous experience
- Lyndon B. Johnson in popular culture
- Lyndon B. Johnson School of Public Affairs
- Lyndon Baines Johnson Library and Museum, University of Texas at Austin
- Presidents of the United States on U.S. postage stamps
- Zephyr Wright

== Notes ==
U.S. House of Representatives
Preceded by James Buchanan	Member of the U.S. House of Representatives from Texas's 10th congressional district 1937–1949	Succeeded by Homer Thornberry
Party political offices
Preceded by Lee O'Daniel	Democratic nominee for U.S. Senator from Texas (Class 2); 1948, 1954, 1960	Succeeded by William A. Blakley
Preceded by Francis J. Myers	Senate Democratic Whip; 1951–1953	Succeeded by Earle Clements
Preceded by Ernest McFarland	Senate Democratic Leader; 1953–1961	Succeeded by Mike Mansfield
Preceded by Estes Kefauver	Democratic nominee for Vice President of the United States; 1960	Succeeded by Hubert Humphrey
Preceded by John F. Kennedy	Democratic nominee for President of the United States; 1964	Succeeded by Hubert Humphrey
U.S. Senate
Preceded by Lee O'Daniel	U.S. Senator (Class 2) from Texas; 1949–1961; Served alongside: Tom Connally, Price Daniel, William A. Blakley, Ralph Yarborough	Succeeded by William A. Blakley
Preceded by Francis J. Myers	Senate Majority Whip; 1951–1953	Succeeded by Leverett Saltonstall
Preceded by Ernest McFarland	Senate Minority Leader; 1953–1955	Succeeded by William F. Knowland
Preceded by William F. Knowland	Senate Majority Leader; 1955–1961	Succeeded by Mike Mansfield
New office	Chair of the Senate Reception Room Committee; 1955–1957	Position abolished
New office	Chair of the Senate Space Committee; 1958–1961	Succeeded by Robert S. Kerr
Political offices
Preceded by Richard Nixon	Vice President of the United States; 1961–1963	Succeeded by Hubert Humphrey
Preceded by John F. Kennedy	President of the United States; 1963–1969	Succeeded by Richard Nixon
Awards and achievements
Preceded by Martin Luther King Jr.	Time Person of the Year; 1964	Succeeded by William Westmoreland
Preceded by Baby boomers	Time Person of the Year; 1967	Succeeded by Astronauts of Apollo 8
Preceded by J. Edgar Hoover	Persons who have lain in state or honor in the United States Capitol rotunda 1973	Succeeded by Hubert Humphrey
